

590001–590100 

|-bgcolor=#E9E9E9
| 590001 ||  || — || August 23, 2004 || Kitt Peak || Spacewatch ||  || align=right | 1.7 km || 
|-id=002 bgcolor=#d6d6d6
| 590002 ||  || — || January 31, 2011 || Piszkesteto || Z. Kuli, K. Sárneczky ||  || align=right | 2.7 km || 
|-id=003 bgcolor=#E9E9E9
| 590003 ||  || — || January 30, 2011 || Mount Lemmon || Mount Lemmon Survey ||  || align=right data-sort-value="0.68" | 680 m || 
|-id=004 bgcolor=#fefefe
| 590004 ||  || — || April 15, 2008 || Kitt Peak || Spacewatch ||  || align=right data-sort-value="0.72" | 720 m || 
|-id=005 bgcolor=#E9E9E9
| 590005 ||  || — || March 16, 2007 || Kitt Peak || Spacewatch ||  || align=right | 1.4 km || 
|-id=006 bgcolor=#E9E9E9
| 590006 ||  || — || August 30, 2005 || Palomar || NEAT ||  || align=right data-sort-value="0.96" | 960 m || 
|-id=007 bgcolor=#fefefe
| 590007 ||  || — || August 29, 2009 || Kitt Peak || Spacewatch ||  || align=right data-sort-value="0.57" | 570 m || 
|-id=008 bgcolor=#E9E9E9
| 590008 ||  || — || January 30, 2011 || Mayhill-ISON || L. Elenin ||  || align=right | 1.1 km || 
|-id=009 bgcolor=#E9E9E9
| 590009 ||  || — || November 15, 2010 || Mount Lemmon || Mount Lemmon Survey ||  || align=right | 1.0 km || 
|-id=010 bgcolor=#d6d6d6
| 590010 ||  || — || January 16, 2011 || Mount Lemmon || Mount Lemmon Survey || 7:4 || align=right | 3.4 km || 
|-id=011 bgcolor=#E9E9E9
| 590011 ||  || — || January 10, 2007 || Kitt Peak || Spacewatch ||  || align=right data-sort-value="0.85" | 850 m || 
|-id=012 bgcolor=#fefefe
| 590012 ||  || — || February 7, 2011 || Mount Lemmon || Mount Lemmon Survey ||  || align=right data-sort-value="0.77" | 770 m || 
|-id=013 bgcolor=#fefefe
| 590013 ||  || — || August 6, 2005 || Palomar || NEAT ||  || align=right data-sort-value="0.99" | 990 m || 
|-id=014 bgcolor=#E9E9E9
| 590014 ||  || — || February 23, 2003 || Kitt Peak || Spacewatch ||  || align=right data-sort-value="0.74" | 740 m || 
|-id=015 bgcolor=#fefefe
| 590015 ||  || — || March 29, 2008 || Kitt Peak || Spacewatch ||  || align=right data-sort-value="0.59" | 590 m || 
|-id=016 bgcolor=#d6d6d6
| 590016 ||  || — || September 25, 2009 || Mount Lemmon || Mount Lemmon Survey ||  || align=right | 1.9 km || 
|-id=017 bgcolor=#E9E9E9
| 590017 ||  || — || January 27, 2007 || Mount Lemmon || Mount Lemmon Survey ||  || align=right | 1.0 km || 
|-id=018 bgcolor=#E9E9E9
| 590018 ||  || — || February 26, 2007 || Mount Lemmon || Mount Lemmon Survey ||  || align=right data-sort-value="0.75" | 750 m || 
|-id=019 bgcolor=#d6d6d6
| 590019 ||  || — || January 2, 2017 || Haleakala || Pan-STARRS ||  || align=right | 2.5 km || 
|-id=020 bgcolor=#E9E9E9
| 590020 ||  || — || April 12, 2016 || Haleakala || Pan-STARRS ||  || align=right data-sort-value="0.73" | 730 m || 
|-id=021 bgcolor=#d6d6d6
| 590021 ||  || — || December 21, 2015 || Mount Lemmon || Mount Lemmon Survey ||  || align=right | 2.7 km || 
|-id=022 bgcolor=#d6d6d6
| 590022 ||  || — || March 27, 2012 || Mount Lemmon || Mount Lemmon Survey ||  || align=right | 2.0 km || 
|-id=023 bgcolor=#E9E9E9
| 590023 ||  || — || January 23, 2011 || Mount Lemmon || Mount Lemmon Survey ||  || align=right data-sort-value="0.94" | 940 m || 
|-id=024 bgcolor=#E9E9E9
| 590024 ||  || — || January 26, 2011 || Mount Lemmon || Mount Lemmon Survey ||  || align=right data-sort-value="0.68" | 680 m || 
|-id=025 bgcolor=#E9E9E9
| 590025 ||  || — || January 23, 2011 || Mount Lemmon || Mount Lemmon Survey ||  || align=right | 1.5 km || 
|-id=026 bgcolor=#E9E9E9
| 590026 ||  || — || January 29, 2011 || Kitt Peak || Spacewatch ||  || align=right | 1.3 km || 
|-id=027 bgcolor=#E9E9E9
| 590027 ||  || — || February 23, 2007 || Mount Lemmon || Mount Lemmon Survey ||  || align=right data-sort-value="0.73" | 730 m || 
|-id=028 bgcolor=#E9E9E9
| 590028 ||  || — || February 22, 2007 || Kitt Peak || Spacewatch ||  || align=right data-sort-value="0.76" | 760 m || 
|-id=029 bgcolor=#d6d6d6
| 590029 ||  || — || February 8, 2011 || Mount Lemmon || Mount Lemmon Survey ||  || align=right | 2.2 km || 
|-id=030 bgcolor=#E9E9E9
| 590030 ||  || — || February 13, 2011 || Mount Lemmon || Mount Lemmon Survey ||  || align=right | 1.5 km || 
|-id=031 bgcolor=#E9E9E9
| 590031 ||  || — || February 5, 2011 || Haleakala || Pan-STARRS ||  || align=right data-sort-value="0.86" | 860 m || 
|-id=032 bgcolor=#d6d6d6
| 590032 ||  || — || March 8, 2005 || Mount Lemmon || Mount Lemmon Survey ||  || align=right | 3.2 km || 
|-id=033 bgcolor=#E9E9E9
| 590033 ||  || — || February 10, 2011 || Mount Lemmon || Mount Lemmon Survey ||  || align=right data-sort-value="0.79" | 790 m || 
|-id=034 bgcolor=#d6d6d6
| 590034 ||  || — || February 26, 2011 || Mount Lemmon || Mount Lemmon Survey ||  || align=right | 2.5 km || 
|-id=035 bgcolor=#E9E9E9
| 590035 ||  || — || February 9, 2011 || Mount Lemmon || Mount Lemmon Survey ||  || align=right data-sort-value="0.84" | 840 m || 
|-id=036 bgcolor=#E9E9E9
| 590036 ||  || — || August 4, 2013 || Haleakala || Pan-STARRS ||  || align=right data-sort-value="0.64" | 640 m || 
|-id=037 bgcolor=#E9E9E9
| 590037 ||  || — || February 16, 2007 || Mount Lemmon || Mount Lemmon Survey ||  || align=right data-sort-value="0.76" | 760 m || 
|-id=038 bgcolor=#d6d6d6
| 590038 ||  || — || August 21, 2015 || Haleakala || Pan-STARRS ||  || align=right | 2.1 km || 
|-id=039 bgcolor=#E9E9E9
| 590039 ||  || — || February 5, 2011 || Haleakala || Pan-STARRS ||  || align=right data-sort-value="0.64" | 640 m || 
|-id=040 bgcolor=#fefefe
| 590040 ||  || — || September 14, 1998 || Kitt Peak || Spacewatch ||  || align=right data-sort-value="0.73" | 730 m || 
|-id=041 bgcolor=#E9E9E9
| 590041 ||  || — || February 22, 2011 || Kitt Peak || Spacewatch ||  || align=right data-sort-value="0.96" | 960 m || 
|-id=042 bgcolor=#E9E9E9
| 590042 ||  || — || February 26, 2011 || Mount Lemmon || Mount Lemmon Survey ||  || align=right data-sort-value="0.81" | 810 m || 
|-id=043 bgcolor=#E9E9E9
| 590043 ||  || — || January 27, 2011 || Mount Lemmon || Mount Lemmon Survey ||  || align=right | 1.3 km || 
|-id=044 bgcolor=#E9E9E9
| 590044 ||  || — || March 11, 2007 || Mount Lemmon || Mount Lemmon Survey ||  || align=right data-sort-value="0.89" | 890 m || 
|-id=045 bgcolor=#E9E9E9
| 590045 ||  || — || March 12, 2003 || Palomar || NEAT ||  || align=right | 1.3 km || 
|-id=046 bgcolor=#fefefe
| 590046 ||  || — || February 25, 2011 || Mount Lemmon || Mount Lemmon Survey ||  || align=right data-sort-value="0.55" | 550 m || 
|-id=047 bgcolor=#E9E9E9
| 590047 ||  || — || February 26, 2011 || Mount Lemmon || Mount Lemmon Survey ||  || align=right | 1.3 km || 
|-id=048 bgcolor=#E9E9E9
| 590048 ||  || — || March 2, 2011 || Bergisch Gladbach || W. Bickel ||  || align=right | 1.1 km || 
|-id=049 bgcolor=#E9E9E9
| 590049 ||  || — || March 31, 2003 || Anderson Mesa || LONEOS ||  || align=right | 1.2 km || 
|-id=050 bgcolor=#E9E9E9
| 590050 ||  || — || March 10, 2007 || Mount Lemmon || Mount Lemmon Survey ||  || align=right data-sort-value="0.89" | 890 m || 
|-id=051 bgcolor=#E9E9E9
| 590051 ||  || — || September 4, 2008 || Kitt Peak || Spacewatch ||  || align=right | 1.5 km || 
|-id=052 bgcolor=#E9E9E9
| 590052 ||  || — || March 11, 2011 || Mayhill-ISON || L. Elenin ||  || align=right data-sort-value="0.88" | 880 m || 
|-id=053 bgcolor=#E9E9E9
| 590053 ||  || — || April 9, 2003 || Palomar || NEAT ||  || align=right data-sort-value="0.95" | 950 m || 
|-id=054 bgcolor=#E9E9E9
| 590054 ||  || — || March 9, 2011 || Mount Lemmon || Mount Lemmon Survey ||  || align=right | 1.1 km || 
|-id=055 bgcolor=#E9E9E9
| 590055 ||  || — || March 11, 2011 || Kitt Peak || Spacewatch ||  || align=right | 1.2 km || 
|-id=056 bgcolor=#E9E9E9
| 590056 ||  || — || October 21, 2017 || Mount Lemmon || Mount Lemmon Survey ||  || align=right | 1.2 km || 
|-id=057 bgcolor=#E9E9E9
| 590057 ||  || — || June 4, 2016 || Mount Lemmon || Mount Lemmon Survey ||  || align=right data-sort-value="0.82" | 820 m || 
|-id=058 bgcolor=#E9E9E9
| 590058 ||  || — || March 13, 2011 || Mount Lemmon || Mount Lemmon Survey ||  || align=right | 1.6 km || 
|-id=059 bgcolor=#E9E9E9
| 590059 ||  || — || March 9, 2011 || Mount Lemmon || Mount Lemmon Survey ||  || align=right | 1.3 km || 
|-id=060 bgcolor=#E9E9E9
| 590060 ||  || — || March 11, 2011 || Mount Lemmon || Mount Lemmon Survey ||  || align=right | 1.2 km || 
|-id=061 bgcolor=#E9E9E9
| 590061 ||  || — || April 15, 2007 || Kitt Peak || Spacewatch ||  || align=right | 1.3 km || 
|-id=062 bgcolor=#E9E9E9
| 590062 ||  || — || January 9, 2002 || Socorro || LINEAR ||  || align=right | 1.7 km || 
|-id=063 bgcolor=#E9E9E9
| 590063 ||  || — || March 9, 2011 || Kitt Peak || Spacewatch ||  || align=right data-sort-value="0.87" | 870 m || 
|-id=064 bgcolor=#E9E9E9
| 590064 ||  || — || March 14, 2011 || Catalina || CSS ||  || align=right | 1.5 km || 
|-id=065 bgcolor=#E9E9E9
| 590065 ||  || — || December 24, 2005 || Socorro || LINEAR || RAF || align=right | 1.2 km || 
|-id=066 bgcolor=#E9E9E9
| 590066 ||  || — || September 25, 2005 || Kitt Peak || Spacewatch ||  || align=right | 1.1 km || 
|-id=067 bgcolor=#E9E9E9
| 590067 ||  || — || March 30, 2011 || Mount Lemmon || Mount Lemmon Survey ||  || align=right data-sort-value="0.80" | 800 m || 
|-id=068 bgcolor=#E9E9E9
| 590068 ||  || — || March 26, 2011 || Mount Lemmon || Mount Lemmon Survey ||  || align=right data-sort-value="0.88" | 880 m || 
|-id=069 bgcolor=#E9E9E9
| 590069 ||  || — || March 25, 2011 || Haleakala || Pan-STARRS ||  || align=right | 1.3 km || 
|-id=070 bgcolor=#E9E9E9
| 590070 ||  || — || May 1, 2003 || Kitt Peak || Spacewatch ||  || align=right | 1.4 km || 
|-id=071 bgcolor=#E9E9E9
| 590071 ||  || — || September 24, 2008 || Kitt Peak || Spacewatch ||  || align=right | 1.4 km || 
|-id=072 bgcolor=#E9E9E9
| 590072 ||  || — || July 11, 2004 || Palomar || NEAT || MAR || align=right | 1.4 km || 
|-id=073 bgcolor=#E9E9E9
| 590073 ||  || — || October 5, 2004 || Palomar || NEAT ||  || align=right | 1.8 km || 
|-id=074 bgcolor=#E9E9E9
| 590074 ||  || — || March 28, 2011 || Mount Lemmon || Mount Lemmon Survey ||  || align=right data-sort-value="0.68" | 680 m || 
|-id=075 bgcolor=#E9E9E9
| 590075 ||  || — || March 23, 2003 || Apache Point || SDSS Collaboration ||  || align=right | 1.3 km || 
|-id=076 bgcolor=#E9E9E9
| 590076 ||  || — || March 6, 2011 || Mount Lemmon || Mount Lemmon Survey || JUN || align=right data-sort-value="0.71" | 710 m || 
|-id=077 bgcolor=#E9E9E9
| 590077 ||  || — || October 1, 2013 || Mount Lemmon || Mount Lemmon Survey ||  || align=right data-sort-value="0.66" | 660 m || 
|-id=078 bgcolor=#E9E9E9
| 590078 ||  || — || March 14, 2007 || Mount Lemmon || Mount Lemmon Survey ||  || align=right | 1.3 km || 
|-id=079 bgcolor=#E9E9E9
| 590079 ||  || — || November 11, 2013 || Mount Lemmon || Mount Lemmon Survey ||  || align=right data-sort-value="0.87" | 870 m || 
|-id=080 bgcolor=#E9E9E9
| 590080 ||  || — || April 2, 2011 || Mount Lemmon || Mount Lemmon Survey ||  || align=right | 1.4 km || 
|-id=081 bgcolor=#E9E9E9
| 590081 ||  || — || March 14, 2011 || Mount Lemmon || Mount Lemmon Survey ||  || align=right | 1.4 km || 
|-id=082 bgcolor=#d6d6d6
| 590082 ||  || — || April 12, 2005 || Kitt Peak || Kitt Peak Obs. ||  || align=right | 2.3 km || 
|-id=083 bgcolor=#E9E9E9
| 590083 ||  || — || October 8, 2008 || Kitt Peak || Spacewatch ||  || align=right | 1.3 km || 
|-id=084 bgcolor=#fefefe
| 590084 ||  || — || January 28, 2007 || Mount Lemmon || Mount Lemmon Survey ||  || align=right data-sort-value="0.58" | 580 m || 
|-id=085 bgcolor=#E9E9E9
| 590085 ||  || — || April 5, 2011 || Mount Lemmon || Mount Lemmon Survey ||  || align=right | 1.0 km || 
|-id=086 bgcolor=#E9E9E9
| 590086 ||  || — || January 10, 2011 || Mount Lemmon || Mount Lemmon Survey ||  || align=right | 1.5 km || 
|-id=087 bgcolor=#E9E9E9
| 590087 ||  || — || October 27, 2005 || Catalina || CSS ||  || align=right data-sort-value="0.80" | 800 m || 
|-id=088 bgcolor=#E9E9E9
| 590088 ||  || — || March 25, 2011 || Mount Lemmon || Mount Lemmon Survey ||  || align=right data-sort-value="0.93" | 930 m || 
|-id=089 bgcolor=#E9E9E9
| 590089 ||  || — || April 6, 2011 || Les Engarouines || L. Bernasconi ||  || align=right data-sort-value="0.89" | 890 m || 
|-id=090 bgcolor=#fefefe
| 590090 ||  || — || June 2, 2008 || Mount Lemmon || Mount Lemmon Survey ||  || align=right data-sort-value="0.81" | 810 m || 
|-id=091 bgcolor=#E9E9E9
| 590091 ||  || — || November 9, 2013 || Haleakala || Pan-STARRS ||  || align=right | 1.4 km || 
|-id=092 bgcolor=#d6d6d6
| 590092 ||  || — || March 26, 2011 || Mount Lemmon || Mount Lemmon Survey ||  || align=right | 2.5 km || 
|-id=093 bgcolor=#E9E9E9
| 590093 ||  || — || June 4, 2016 || Mount Lemmon || Mount Lemmon Survey ||  || align=right data-sort-value="0.87" | 870 m || 
|-id=094 bgcolor=#E9E9E9
| 590094 ||  || — || January 17, 2015 || Mount Lemmon || Mount Lemmon Survey ||  || align=right | 1.5 km || 
|-id=095 bgcolor=#E9E9E9
| 590095 ||  || — || March 29, 2011 || Kitt Peak || Spacewatch ||  || align=right | 1.4 km || 
|-id=096 bgcolor=#E9E9E9
| 590096 ||  || — || March 27, 2011 || Mount Lemmon || Mount Lemmon Survey ||  || align=right data-sort-value="0.87" | 870 m || 
|-id=097 bgcolor=#E9E9E9
| 590097 ||  || — || October 23, 2001 || Anderson Mesa || LONEOS ||  || align=right | 1.3 km || 
|-id=098 bgcolor=#d6d6d6
| 590098 ||  || — || March 11, 2011 || Mount Lemmon || Mount Lemmon Survey ||  || align=right | 2.7 km || 
|-id=099 bgcolor=#E9E9E9
| 590099 ||  || — || April 2, 2011 || Mount Lemmon || Mount Lemmon Survey ||  || align=right data-sort-value="0.80" | 800 m || 
|-id=100 bgcolor=#E9E9E9
| 590100 ||  || — || April 4, 2011 || Mount Lemmon || Mount Lemmon Survey ||  || align=right | 1.3 km || 
|}

590101–590200 

|-bgcolor=#E9E9E9
| 590101 ||  || — || February 21, 2002 || Kitt Peak || Spacewatch ||  || align=right | 1.6 km || 
|-id=102 bgcolor=#E9E9E9
| 590102 ||  || — || March 11, 2011 || Kitt Peak || Spacewatch ||  || align=right | 2.2 km || 
|-id=103 bgcolor=#d6d6d6
| 590103 ||  || — || March 11, 2011 || Kitt Peak || Spacewatch ||  || align=right | 2.9 km || 
|-id=104 bgcolor=#E9E9E9
| 590104 ||  || — || April 5, 2011 || Kitt Peak || Spacewatch ||  || align=right data-sort-value="0.84" | 840 m || 
|-id=105 bgcolor=#E9E9E9
| 590105 ||  || — || April 1, 2011 || Mount Lemmon || Mount Lemmon Survey ||  || align=right | 1.1 km || 
|-id=106 bgcolor=#E9E9E9
| 590106 ||  || — || November 27, 2013 || Haleakala || Pan-STARRS ||  || align=right data-sort-value="0.76" | 760 m || 
|-id=107 bgcolor=#E9E9E9
| 590107 ||  || — || October 16, 2013 || Mount Lemmon || Mount Lemmon Survey ||  || align=right data-sort-value="0.82" | 820 m || 
|-id=108 bgcolor=#E9E9E9
| 590108 ||  || — || April 12, 2011 || Mount Lemmon || Mount Lemmon Survey ||  || align=right data-sort-value="0.74" | 740 m || 
|-id=109 bgcolor=#E9E9E9
| 590109 ||  || — || April 12, 2011 || Mount Lemmon || Mount Lemmon Survey ||  || align=right | 1.3 km || 
|-id=110 bgcolor=#E9E9E9
| 590110 ||  || — || April 8, 2011 || Siding Spring || SSS ||  || align=right | 1.7 km || 
|-id=111 bgcolor=#E9E9E9
| 590111 ||  || — || April 21, 2011 || Haleakala || Pan-STARRS ||  || align=right | 1.5 km || 
|-id=112 bgcolor=#E9E9E9
| 590112 ||  || — || April 13, 2002 || Palomar || NEAT ||  || align=right | 2.0 km || 
|-id=113 bgcolor=#E9E9E9
| 590113 ||  || — || November 5, 2004 || Needville || J. Dellinger ||  || align=right | 1.7 km || 
|-id=114 bgcolor=#E9E9E9
| 590114 ||  || — || December 13, 2004 || Junk Bond || D. Healy ||  || align=right | 2.3 km || 
|-id=115 bgcolor=#E9E9E9
| 590115 ||  || — || April 6, 2011 || Mount Lemmon || Mount Lemmon Survey ||  || align=right data-sort-value="0.96" | 960 m || 
|-id=116 bgcolor=#E9E9E9
| 590116 ||  || — || April 30, 2011 || Haleakala || Pan-STARRS ||  || align=right | 1.4 km || 
|-id=117 bgcolor=#d6d6d6
| 590117 ||  || — || April 30, 2011 || Kitt Peak || Spacewatch ||  || align=right | 2.8 km || 
|-id=118 bgcolor=#E9E9E9
| 590118 ||  || — || May 5, 2002 || Palomar || NEAT ||  || align=right | 2.1 km || 
|-id=119 bgcolor=#E9E9E9
| 590119 ||  || — || November 9, 2009 || Kitt Peak || Spacewatch ||  || align=right | 1.0 km || 
|-id=120 bgcolor=#E9E9E9
| 590120 ||  || — || January 17, 2011 || Mount Lemmon || Mount Lemmon Survey || JUN || align=right | 1.2 km || 
|-id=121 bgcolor=#E9E9E9
| 590121 ||  || — || April 30, 2011 || Haleakala || Pan-STARRS ||  || align=right | 2.4 km || 
|-id=122 bgcolor=#E9E9E9
| 590122 ||  || — || April 28, 2011 || Mount Lemmon || Mount Lemmon Survey ||  || align=right | 1.5 km || 
|-id=123 bgcolor=#E9E9E9
| 590123 ||  || — || April 26, 2011 || Kitt Peak || Spacewatch ||  || align=right | 2.0 km || 
|-id=124 bgcolor=#E9E9E9
| 590124 ||  || — || December 20, 2004 || Mount Lemmon || Mount Lemmon Survey ||  || align=right | 2.3 km || 
|-id=125 bgcolor=#E9E9E9
| 590125 ||  || — || May 5, 2011 || Kitt Peak || Spacewatch ||  || align=right | 1.5 km || 
|-id=126 bgcolor=#E9E9E9
| 590126 ||  || — || May 6, 2011 || Mount Lemmon || Mount Lemmon Survey ||  || align=right | 1.0 km || 
|-id=127 bgcolor=#E9E9E9
| 590127 ||  || — || April 25, 2007 || Kitt Peak || Spacewatch ||  || align=right | 1.4 km || 
|-id=128 bgcolor=#E9E9E9
| 590128 ||  || — || April 30, 2011 || Haleakala || Pan-STARRS ||  || align=right | 1.9 km || 
|-id=129 bgcolor=#E9E9E9
| 590129 ||  || — || May 1, 2011 || Haleakala || Pan-STARRS ||  || align=right | 1.3 km || 
|-id=130 bgcolor=#E9E9E9
| 590130 ||  || — || May 1, 2011 || Haleakala || Pan-STARRS ||  || align=right | 1.6 km || 
|-id=131 bgcolor=#fefefe
| 590131 ||  || — || May 13, 2011 || Mount Lemmon || Mount Lemmon Survey ||  || align=right data-sort-value="0.55" | 550 m || 
|-id=132 bgcolor=#E9E9E9
| 590132 ||  || — || May 3, 2011 || Marly || P. Kocher ||  || align=right | 2.0 km || 
|-id=133 bgcolor=#E9E9E9
| 590133 ||  || — || August 26, 2012 || Haleakala || Pan-STARRS ||  || align=right | 1.6 km || 
|-id=134 bgcolor=#E9E9E9
| 590134 ||  || — || May 1, 2011 || Haleakala || Pan-STARRS ||  || align=right | 1.7 km || 
|-id=135 bgcolor=#E9E9E9
| 590135 ||  || — || May 8, 2011 || Mount Lemmon || Mount Lemmon Survey ||  || align=right | 1.5 km || 
|-id=136 bgcolor=#E9E9E9
| 590136 ||  || — || May 5, 2011 || Mount Lemmon || Mount Lemmon Survey ||  || align=right | 1.7 km || 
|-id=137 bgcolor=#fefefe
| 590137 ||  || — || May 24, 2011 || Nogales || M. Schwartz, P. R. Holvorcem ||  || align=right data-sort-value="0.66" | 660 m || 
|-id=138 bgcolor=#E9E9E9
| 590138 ||  || — || May 24, 2011 || Haleakala || Pan-STARRS ||  || align=right data-sort-value="0.99" | 990 m || 
|-id=139 bgcolor=#E9E9E9
| 590139 ||  || — || November 10, 2009 || Kitt Peak || Spacewatch ||  || align=right | 1.4 km || 
|-id=140 bgcolor=#E9E9E9
| 590140 ||  || — || May 28, 2011 || Mount Lemmon || Mount Lemmon Survey ||  || align=right | 1.3 km || 
|-id=141 bgcolor=#fefefe
| 590141 ||  || — || April 9, 2003 || Kitt Peak || Spacewatch ||  || align=right data-sort-value="0.90" | 900 m || 
|-id=142 bgcolor=#E9E9E9
| 590142 ||  || — || May 24, 2011 || Haleakala || Pan-STARRS ||  || align=right | 1.9 km || 
|-id=143 bgcolor=#E9E9E9
| 590143 ||  || — || May 28, 2011 || Mount Lemmon || Mount Lemmon Survey ||  || align=right | 1.7 km || 
|-id=144 bgcolor=#E9E9E9
| 590144 ||  || — || May 26, 2011 || Mount Lemmon || Mount Lemmon Survey ||  || align=right | 1.4 km || 
|-id=145 bgcolor=#fefefe
| 590145 ||  || — || July 2, 2008 || Kitt Peak || Spacewatch ||  || align=right data-sort-value="0.50" | 500 m || 
|-id=146 bgcolor=#E9E9E9
| 590146 ||  || — || June 5, 2011 || Mount Lemmon || Mount Lemmon Survey ||  || align=right | 2.1 km || 
|-id=147 bgcolor=#E9E9E9
| 590147 ||  || — || June 12, 2011 || Mount Lemmon || Mount Lemmon Survey ||  || align=right | 2.2 km || 
|-id=148 bgcolor=#fefefe
| 590148 ||  || — || February 8, 2007 || Kitt Peak || Spacewatch ||  || align=right data-sort-value="0.58" | 580 m || 
|-id=149 bgcolor=#E9E9E9
| 590149 ||  || — || January 29, 2000 || Kitt Peak || Spacewatch ||  || align=right | 2.0 km || 
|-id=150 bgcolor=#E9E9E9
| 590150 ||  || — || July 28, 2011 || Haleakala || Pan-STARRS ||  || align=right | 2.0 km || 
|-id=151 bgcolor=#E9E9E9
| 590151 ||  || — || July 27, 2011 || Charleston || R. Holmes ||  || align=right | 1.6 km || 
|-id=152 bgcolor=#d6d6d6
| 590152 ||  || — || August 6, 2011 || Haleakala || Pan-STARRS ||  || align=right | 1.9 km || 
|-id=153 bgcolor=#fefefe
| 590153 ||  || — || August 1, 2011 || Haleakala || Pan-STARRS ||  || align=right data-sort-value="0.56" | 560 m || 
|-id=154 bgcolor=#d6d6d6
| 590154 ||  || — || February 24, 2009 || Calar Alto || F. Hormuth ||  || align=right | 2.2 km || 
|-id=155 bgcolor=#d6d6d6
| 590155 ||  || — || August 30, 2011 || Haleakala || Pan-STARRS ||  || align=right | 2.3 km || 
|-id=156 bgcolor=#fefefe
| 590156 ||  || — || August 30, 2011 || Haleakala || Pan-STARRS ||  || align=right data-sort-value="0.65" | 650 m || 
|-id=157 bgcolor=#E9E9E9
| 590157 ||  || — || December 31, 2008 || Mount Lemmon || Mount Lemmon Survey ||  || align=right | 2.3 km || 
|-id=158 bgcolor=#d6d6d6
| 590158 ||  || — || September 18, 2006 || Kitt Peak || Spacewatch ||  || align=right | 2.2 km || 
|-id=159 bgcolor=#E9E9E9
| 590159 ||  || — || February 26, 2014 || Mount Lemmon || Mount Lemmon Survey ||  || align=right | 1.8 km || 
|-id=160 bgcolor=#d6d6d6
| 590160 ||  || — || May 21, 2015 || Haleakala || Pan-STARRS ||  || align=right | 1.7 km || 
|-id=161 bgcolor=#d6d6d6
| 590161 ||  || — || August 30, 2011 || Haleakala || Pan-STARRS ||  || align=right | 2.4 km || 
|-id=162 bgcolor=#fefefe
| 590162 ||  || — || August 31, 2011 || Haleakala || Pan-STARRS ||  || align=right data-sort-value="0.74" | 740 m || 
|-id=163 bgcolor=#d6d6d6
| 590163 ||  || — || September 5, 2011 || Haleakala || Pan-STARRS ||  || align=right | 1.6 km || 
|-id=164 bgcolor=#FA8072
| 590164 ||  || — || September 2, 2011 || Haleakala || Pan-STARRS || H || align=right data-sort-value="0.38" | 380 m || 
|-id=165 bgcolor=#d6d6d6
| 590165 ||  || — || September 6, 2011 || Great Shefford || P. Birtwhistle ||  || align=right | 2.1 km || 
|-id=166 bgcolor=#d6d6d6
| 590166 ||  || — || March 2, 2009 || Kitt Peak || Spacewatch ||  || align=right | 2.8 km || 
|-id=167 bgcolor=#d6d6d6
| 590167 ||  || — || September 4, 2011 || Haleakala || Pan-STARRS ||  || align=right | 1.8 km || 
|-id=168 bgcolor=#d6d6d6
| 590168 ||  || — || September 4, 2011 || Haleakala || Pan-STARRS ||  || align=right | 1.9 km || 
|-id=169 bgcolor=#E9E9E9
| 590169 ||  || — || September 2, 2011 || Haleakala || Pan-STARRS ||  || align=right | 2.1 km || 
|-id=170 bgcolor=#d6d6d6
| 590170 ||  || — || September 8, 2011 || Haleakala || Pan-STARRS ||  || align=right | 1.8 km || 
|-id=171 bgcolor=#d6d6d6
| 590171 ||  || — || August 13, 2006 || Palomar || NEAT || BRA || align=right | 2.0 km || 
|-id=172 bgcolor=#d6d6d6
| 590172 ||  || — || September 5, 2000 || Apache Point || SDSS Collaboration ||  || align=right | 2.9 km || 
|-id=173 bgcolor=#d6d6d6
| 590173 ||  || — || September 26, 2006 || Mount Lemmon || Mount Lemmon Survey ||  || align=right | 1.7 km || 
|-id=174 bgcolor=#fefefe
| 590174 ||  || — || April 9, 2010 || Mount Lemmon || Mount Lemmon Survey ||  || align=right data-sort-value="0.55" | 550 m || 
|-id=175 bgcolor=#d6d6d6
| 590175 ||  || — || September 23, 2011 || Taunus || Taunus Obs. ||  || align=right | 2.2 km || 
|-id=176 bgcolor=#d6d6d6
| 590176 ||  || — || October 2, 2006 || Mount Lemmon || Mount Lemmon Survey ||  || align=right | 1.8 km || 
|-id=177 bgcolor=#fefefe
| 590177 ||  || — || September 4, 2011 || Haleakala || Pan-STARRS ||  || align=right data-sort-value="0.54" | 540 m || 
|-id=178 bgcolor=#d6d6d6
| 590178 ||  || — || September 18, 2006 || Kitt Peak || Spacewatch ||  || align=right | 2.0 km || 
|-id=179 bgcolor=#fefefe
| 590179 ||  || — || September 23, 2011 || Haleakala || Pan-STARRS ||  || align=right data-sort-value="0.52" | 520 m || 
|-id=180 bgcolor=#fefefe
| 590180 ||  || — || October 22, 2001 || Socorro || LINEAR ||  || align=right data-sort-value="0.67" | 670 m || 
|-id=181 bgcolor=#fefefe
| 590181 ||  || — || September 26, 2011 || Kitt Peak || Spacewatch ||  || align=right data-sort-value="0.56" | 560 m || 
|-id=182 bgcolor=#d6d6d6
| 590182 ||  || — || September 20, 2011 || Haleakala || Pan-STARRS ||  || align=right | 2.0 km || 
|-id=183 bgcolor=#E9E9E9
| 590183 ||  || — || October 8, 2007 || Kitt Peak || Spacewatch ||  || align=right | 1.1 km || 
|-id=184 bgcolor=#d6d6d6
| 590184 ||  || — || August 19, 2001 || Cerro Tololo || Cerro Tololo Obs. ||  || align=right | 2.0 km || 
|-id=185 bgcolor=#fefefe
| 590185 ||  || — || September 20, 2011 || Mount Lemmon || Mount Lemmon Survey ||  || align=right data-sort-value="0.63" | 630 m || 
|-id=186 bgcolor=#d6d6d6
| 590186 ||  || — || September 30, 2006 || Catalina || CSS ||  || align=right | 2.4 km || 
|-id=187 bgcolor=#E9E9E9
| 590187 ||  || — || July 18, 2006 || Mount Lemmon || Mount Lemmon Survey ||  || align=right | 1.9 km || 
|-id=188 bgcolor=#d6d6d6
| 590188 ||  || — || August 30, 2011 || Kitt Peak || Spacewatch ||  || align=right | 1.9 km || 
|-id=189 bgcolor=#E9E9E9
| 590189 ||  || — || November 9, 2007 || Kitt Peak || Spacewatch ||  || align=right | 1.5 km || 
|-id=190 bgcolor=#d6d6d6
| 590190 ||  || — || September 30, 2011 || Taunus || E. Schwab, R. Kling ||  || align=right | 3.1 km || 
|-id=191 bgcolor=#d6d6d6
| 590191 ||  || — || January 28, 2003 || Apache Point || SDSS Collaboration ||  || align=right | 2.1 km || 
|-id=192 bgcolor=#d6d6d6
| 590192 ||  || — || November 11, 2007 || Mount Lemmon || Mount Lemmon Survey ||  || align=right | 3.3 km || 
|-id=193 bgcolor=#fefefe
| 590193 ||  || — || September 20, 2011 || Kitt Peak || Spacewatch ||  || align=right data-sort-value="0.60" | 600 m || 
|-id=194 bgcolor=#fefefe
| 590194 ||  || — || March 23, 2003 || Apache Point || SDSS Collaboration ||  || align=right data-sort-value="0.68" | 680 m || 
|-id=195 bgcolor=#d6d6d6
| 590195 ||  || — || October 16, 2006 || Catalina || CSS ||  || align=right | 2.2 km || 
|-id=196 bgcolor=#d6d6d6
| 590196 ||  || — || September 23, 2011 || Kitt Peak || Spacewatch ||  || align=right | 2.3 km || 
|-id=197 bgcolor=#d6d6d6
| 590197 ||  || — || September 29, 2011 || Mount Lemmon || Mount Lemmon Survey ||  || align=right | 2.2 km || 
|-id=198 bgcolor=#d6d6d6
| 590198 ||  || — || September 27, 2011 || Mount Lemmon || Mount Lemmon Survey ||  || align=right | 2.0 km || 
|-id=199 bgcolor=#d6d6d6
| 590199 ||  || — || September 20, 2011 || Haleakala || Pan-STARRS ||  || align=right | 2.3 km || 
|-id=200 bgcolor=#E9E9E9
| 590200 ||  || — || September 20, 2011 || Haleakala || Pan-STARRS ||  || align=right | 1.8 km || 
|}

590201–590300 

|-bgcolor=#fefefe
| 590201 ||  || — || September 18, 2011 || Mount Lemmon || Mount Lemmon Survey ||  || align=right data-sort-value="0.51" | 510 m || 
|-id=202 bgcolor=#fefefe
| 590202 ||  || — || September 23, 2011 || Haleakala || Pan-STARRS ||  || align=right data-sort-value="0.56" | 560 m || 
|-id=203 bgcolor=#fefefe
| 590203 ||  || — || September 20, 2011 || Mount Lemmon || Mount Lemmon Survey ||  || align=right data-sort-value="0.54" | 540 m || 
|-id=204 bgcolor=#d6d6d6
| 590204 ||  || — || September 26, 2011 || Haleakala || Pan-STARRS ||  || align=right | 2.1 km || 
|-id=205 bgcolor=#E9E9E9
| 590205 ||  || — || September 26, 2011 || Haleakala || Pan-STARRS ||  || align=right | 1.6 km || 
|-id=206 bgcolor=#d6d6d6
| 590206 ||  || — || September 21, 2011 || Kitt Peak || Spacewatch ||  || align=right | 2.4 km || 
|-id=207 bgcolor=#C2FFFF
| 590207 ||  || — || October 13, 2010 || Mount Lemmon || Mount Lemmon Survey || L4 || align=right | 12 km || 
|-id=208 bgcolor=#d6d6d6
| 590208 ||  || — || September 21, 2011 || Kitt Peak || Spacewatch ||  || align=right | 2.2 km || 
|-id=209 bgcolor=#E9E9E9
| 590209 ||  || — || September 23, 2011 || Kitt Peak || Spacewatch ||  || align=right | 2.1 km || 
|-id=210 bgcolor=#d6d6d6
| 590210 ||  || — || October 19, 2006 || Mount Lemmon || Mount Lemmon Survey ||  || align=right | 2.2 km || 
|-id=211 bgcolor=#fefefe
| 590211 ||  || — || December 3, 2005 || Mauna Kea || Mauna Kea Obs. ||  || align=right data-sort-value="0.92" | 920 m || 
|-id=212 bgcolor=#d6d6d6
| 590212 ||  || — || October 16, 2011 || Haleakala || Pan-STARRS ||  || align=right | 2.3 km || 
|-id=213 bgcolor=#E9E9E9
| 590213 ||  || — || December 4, 2007 || Catalina || CSS ||  || align=right | 1.2 km || 
|-id=214 bgcolor=#d6d6d6
| 590214 ||  || — || October 20, 2006 || Kitt Peak || Spacewatch ||  || align=right | 2.4 km || 
|-id=215 bgcolor=#d6d6d6
| 590215 ||  || — || September 24, 2011 || Haleakala || Pan-STARRS ||  || align=right | 2.0 km || 
|-id=216 bgcolor=#d6d6d6
| 590216 ||  || — || September 24, 2011 || Haleakala || Pan-STARRS ||  || align=right | 2.1 km || 
|-id=217 bgcolor=#E9E9E9
| 590217 ||  || — || October 18, 2011 || Mount Lemmon || Mount Lemmon Survey ||  || align=right | 1.3 km || 
|-id=218 bgcolor=#C7FF8F
| 590218 ||  || — || September 4, 2011 || Haleakala || Pan-STARRS || centaur || align=right | 77 km || 
|-id=219 bgcolor=#d6d6d6
| 590219 ||  || — || September 3, 2010 || Mount Lemmon || Mount Lemmon Survey ||  || align=right | 2.7 km || 
|-id=220 bgcolor=#d6d6d6
| 590220 ||  || — || October 21, 2011 || Mount Lemmon || Mount Lemmon Survey ||  || align=right | 2.1 km || 
|-id=221 bgcolor=#d6d6d6
| 590221 ||  || — || July 29, 2005 || Palomar || NEAT ||  || align=right | 2.6 km || 
|-id=222 bgcolor=#fefefe
| 590222 ||  || — || October 20, 2011 || Mount Lemmon || Mount Lemmon Survey ||  || align=right data-sort-value="0.49" | 490 m || 
|-id=223 bgcolor=#d6d6d6
| 590223 ||  || — || October 22, 2011 || Siegen || H. Bill ||  || align=right | 2.1 km || 
|-id=224 bgcolor=#fefefe
| 590224 ||  || — || October 21, 2011 || Haleakala || Pan-STARRS ||  || align=right data-sort-value="0.52" | 520 m || 
|-id=225 bgcolor=#d6d6d6
| 590225 ||  || — || August 29, 2005 || Palomar || NEAT || EOS || align=right | 2.0 km || 
|-id=226 bgcolor=#FA8072
| 590226 ||  || — || September 27, 2011 || Mount Lemmon || Mount Lemmon Survey || H || align=right data-sort-value="0.54" | 540 m || 
|-id=227 bgcolor=#d6d6d6
| 590227 ||  || — || October 6, 2005 || Kitt Peak || Spacewatch || HYG || align=right | 2.2 km || 
|-id=228 bgcolor=#d6d6d6
| 590228 ||  || — || October 1, 2011 || Mount Lemmon || Mount Lemmon Survey ||  || align=right | 2.3 km || 
|-id=229 bgcolor=#fefefe
| 590229 ||  || — || September 23, 2011 || Kitt Peak || Spacewatch ||  || align=right data-sort-value="0.60" | 600 m || 
|-id=230 bgcolor=#fefefe
| 590230 ||  || — || August 20, 2004 || Kitt Peak || Spacewatch ||  || align=right data-sort-value="0.53" | 530 m || 
|-id=231 bgcolor=#d6d6d6
| 590231 ||  || — || October 23, 2011 || Kitt Peak || Spacewatch ||  || align=right | 2.5 km || 
|-id=232 bgcolor=#d6d6d6
| 590232 ||  || — || January 22, 2002 || Kitt Peak || Spacewatch ||  || align=right | 2.5 km || 
|-id=233 bgcolor=#fefefe
| 590233 ||  || — || December 14, 2001 || Palomar || NEAT ||  || align=right data-sort-value="0.62" | 620 m || 
|-id=234 bgcolor=#d6d6d6
| 590234 ||  || — || October 26, 2011 || Haleakala || Pan-STARRS ||  || align=right | 2.5 km || 
|-id=235 bgcolor=#d6d6d6
| 590235 ||  || — || October 21, 2011 || Mount Lemmon || Mount Lemmon Survey ||  || align=right | 2.7 km || 
|-id=236 bgcolor=#d6d6d6
| 590236 ||  || — || October 23, 2011 || Haleakala || Pan-STARRS ||  || align=right | 2.0 km || 
|-id=237 bgcolor=#d6d6d6
| 590237 ||  || — || October 20, 2011 || Mount Lemmon || Mount Lemmon Survey ||  || align=right | 2.2 km || 
|-id=238 bgcolor=#FA8072
| 590238 ||  || — || December 5, 2008 || Kitt Peak || Spacewatch ||  || align=right data-sort-value="0.84" | 840 m || 
|-id=239 bgcolor=#d6d6d6
| 590239 ||  || — || January 12, 2008 || Mount Lemmon || Mount Lemmon Survey ||  || align=right | 2.3 km || 
|-id=240 bgcolor=#d6d6d6
| 590240 ||  || — || October 18, 2011 || Catalina || CSS ||  || align=right | 2.7 km || 
|-id=241 bgcolor=#FA8072
| 590241 ||  || — || September 27, 2006 || Mount Lemmon || Mount Lemmon Survey || H || align=right data-sort-value="0.54" | 540 m || 
|-id=242 bgcolor=#fefefe
| 590242 ||  || — || October 21, 2011 || Piszkesteto || K. Sárneczky || PHO || align=right | 1.5 km || 
|-id=243 bgcolor=#fefefe
| 590243 ||  || — || July 19, 2001 || Palomar || NEAT ||  || align=right data-sort-value="0.82" | 820 m || 
|-id=244 bgcolor=#fefefe
| 590244 ||  || — || October 25, 2011 || Haleakala || Pan-STARRS ||  || align=right data-sort-value="0.52" | 520 m || 
|-id=245 bgcolor=#d6d6d6
| 590245 ||  || — || January 12, 2008 || Kitt Peak || Spacewatch ||  || align=right | 2.0 km || 
|-id=246 bgcolor=#d6d6d6
| 590246 ||  || — || September 23, 2011 || Kitt Peak || Spacewatch ||  || align=right | 2.4 km || 
|-id=247 bgcolor=#E9E9E9
| 590247 ||  || — || October 16, 2007 || Mount Lemmon || Mount Lemmon Survey ||  || align=right | 1.8 km || 
|-id=248 bgcolor=#d6d6d6
| 590248 ||  || — || October 25, 2011 || Haleakala || Pan-STARRS ||  || align=right | 2.0 km || 
|-id=249 bgcolor=#d6d6d6
| 590249 ||  || — || April 27, 2009 || Mount Lemmon || Mount Lemmon Survey ||  || align=right | 2.6 km || 
|-id=250 bgcolor=#d6d6d6
| 590250 ||  || — || October 24, 2011 || Haleakala || Pan-STARRS ||  || align=right | 2.2 km || 
|-id=251 bgcolor=#fefefe
| 590251 ||  || — || October 25, 2011 || Haleakala || Pan-STARRS ||  || align=right data-sort-value="0.63" | 630 m || 
|-id=252 bgcolor=#d6d6d6
| 590252 ||  || — || March 18, 2002 || Kitt Peak || M. W. Buie, D. E. Trilling ||  || align=right | 1.5 km || 
|-id=253 bgcolor=#d6d6d6
| 590253 ||  || — || December 12, 2006 || Kitt Peak || Spacewatch ||  || align=right | 2.3 km || 
|-id=254 bgcolor=#fefefe
| 590254 ||  || — || January 18, 2009 || Kitt Peak || Spacewatch ||  || align=right data-sort-value="0.48" | 480 m || 
|-id=255 bgcolor=#d6d6d6
| 590255 ||  || — || August 29, 2005 || Kitt Peak || Spacewatch ||  || align=right | 1.7 km || 
|-id=256 bgcolor=#d6d6d6
| 590256 ||  || — || October 25, 2011 || Haleakala || Pan-STARRS ||  || align=right | 2.4 km || 
|-id=257 bgcolor=#d6d6d6
| 590257 ||  || — || October 4, 2011 || Piszkesteto || K. Sárneczky ||  || align=right | 3.0 km || 
|-id=258 bgcolor=#d6d6d6
| 590258 ||  || — || October 2, 2006 || Mount Lemmon || Mount Lemmon Survey ||  || align=right | 2.1 km || 
|-id=259 bgcolor=#d6d6d6
| 590259 ||  || — || November 1, 2006 || Kitt Peak || Spacewatch ||  || align=right | 2.0 km || 
|-id=260 bgcolor=#d6d6d6
| 590260 ||  || — || October 21, 2011 || Kitt Peak || Spacewatch ||  || align=right | 2.2 km || 
|-id=261 bgcolor=#d6d6d6
| 590261 ||  || — || October 31, 2011 || Mount Lemmon || Mount Lemmon Survey ||  || align=right | 1.9 km || 
|-id=262 bgcolor=#fefefe
| 590262 ||  || — || October 30, 2011 || Kitt Peak || Spacewatch ||  || align=right data-sort-value="0.58" | 580 m || 
|-id=263 bgcolor=#d6d6d6
| 590263 ||  || — || November 16, 2006 || Mount Lemmon || Mount Lemmon Survey ||  || align=right | 2.2 km || 
|-id=264 bgcolor=#d6d6d6
| 590264 ||  || — || October 31, 2011 || Mayhill-ISON || L. Elenin ||  || align=right | 2.3 km || 
|-id=265 bgcolor=#d6d6d6
| 590265 ||  || — || July 10, 2005 || Kitt Peak || Spacewatch ||  || align=right | 2.9 km || 
|-id=266 bgcolor=#d6d6d6
| 590266 ||  || — || April 2, 2009 || Kitt Peak || Spacewatch ||  || align=right | 2.3 km || 
|-id=267 bgcolor=#E9E9E9
| 590267 ||  || — || October 23, 2011 || Mount Lemmon || Mount Lemmon Survey ||  || align=right | 1.4 km || 
|-id=268 bgcolor=#d6d6d6
| 590268 ||  || — || September 8, 2011 || Kitt Peak || Spacewatch ||  || align=right | 2.1 km || 
|-id=269 bgcolor=#d6d6d6
| 590269 ||  || — || September 27, 2011 || Piszkesteto || A. Farkas ||  || align=right | 2.5 km || 
|-id=270 bgcolor=#d6d6d6
| 590270 ||  || — || October 18, 2011 || Kitt Peak || Spacewatch ||  || align=right | 2.2 km || 
|-id=271 bgcolor=#fefefe
| 590271 ||  || — || October 18, 2011 || Kitt Peak || Spacewatch ||  || align=right data-sort-value="0.62" | 620 m || 
|-id=272 bgcolor=#d6d6d6
| 590272 ||  || — || October 3, 2006 || Mount Lemmon || Mount Lemmon Survey ||  || align=right | 2.0 km || 
|-id=273 bgcolor=#d6d6d6
| 590273 ||  || — || October 20, 2011 || Mount Lemmon || Mount Lemmon Survey ||  || align=right | 2.0 km || 
|-id=274 bgcolor=#d6d6d6
| 590274 ||  || — || March 23, 2003 || Apache Point || SDSS Collaboration ||  || align=right | 2.7 km || 
|-id=275 bgcolor=#d6d6d6
| 590275 ||  || — || October 11, 2006 || Kitt Peak || Spacewatch ||  || align=right | 1.7 km || 
|-id=276 bgcolor=#d6d6d6
| 590276 ||  || — || June 20, 2010 || Mount Lemmon || Mount Lemmon Survey ||  || align=right | 2.5 km || 
|-id=277 bgcolor=#d6d6d6
| 590277 ||  || — || September 24, 2011 || Haleakala || Pan-STARRS ||  || align=right | 2.4 km || 
|-id=278 bgcolor=#d6d6d6
| 590278 ||  || — || October 25, 2011 || Haleakala || Pan-STARRS ||  || align=right | 2.2 km || 
|-id=279 bgcolor=#d6d6d6
| 590279 ||  || — || October 16, 2011 || Haleakala || Pan-STARRS ||  || align=right | 2.9 km || 
|-id=280 bgcolor=#fefefe
| 590280 ||  || — || October 21, 2006 || Catalina || CSS || H || align=right data-sort-value="0.56" | 560 m || 
|-id=281 bgcolor=#fefefe
| 590281 ||  || — || April 8, 2010 || La Sagra || OAM Obs. || H || align=right data-sort-value="0.87" | 870 m || 
|-id=282 bgcolor=#FA8072
| 590282 ||  || — || November 22, 2006 || Catalina || CSS || H || align=right data-sort-value="0.56" | 560 m || 
|-id=283 bgcolor=#d6d6d6
| 590283 ||  || — || October 24, 2011 || Haleakala || Pan-STARRS ||  || align=right | 3.4 km || 
|-id=284 bgcolor=#d6d6d6
| 590284 ||  || — || January 18, 2013 || Haleakala || Pan-STARRS ||  || align=right | 2.7 km || 
|-id=285 bgcolor=#d6d6d6
| 590285 ||  || — || October 24, 2011 || Haleakala || Pan-STARRS ||  || align=right | 2.6 km || 
|-id=286 bgcolor=#d6d6d6
| 590286 ||  || — || October 27, 2011 || Mount Lemmon || Mount Lemmon Survey ||  || align=right | 2.1 km || 
|-id=287 bgcolor=#d6d6d6
| 590287 ||  || — || October 19, 2011 || Mount Lemmon || Mount Lemmon Survey ||  || align=right | 2.6 km || 
|-id=288 bgcolor=#d6d6d6
| 590288 ||  || — || October 26, 2011 || Haleakala || Pan-STARRS ||  || align=right | 2.1 km || 
|-id=289 bgcolor=#d6d6d6
| 590289 ||  || — || October 20, 2011 || Kitt Peak || Spacewatch ||  || align=right | 2.2 km || 
|-id=290 bgcolor=#d6d6d6
| 590290 ||  || — || December 15, 2006 || Kitt Peak || Spacewatch ||  || align=right | 2.2 km || 
|-id=291 bgcolor=#d6d6d6
| 590291 ||  || — || April 6, 2014 || Mount Lemmon || Mount Lemmon Survey ||  || align=right | 2.5 km || 
|-id=292 bgcolor=#fefefe
| 590292 ||  || — || October 16, 2011 || Kitt Peak || Spacewatch || H || align=right data-sort-value="0.42" | 420 m || 
|-id=293 bgcolor=#fefefe
| 590293 ||  || — || October 26, 2011 || Haleakala || Pan-STARRS ||  || align=right data-sort-value="0.50" | 500 m || 
|-id=294 bgcolor=#d6d6d6
| 590294 ||  || — || April 4, 2014 || Kitt Peak || Spacewatch ||  || align=right | 1.6 km || 
|-id=295 bgcolor=#d6d6d6
| 590295 ||  || — || October 25, 2011 || Haleakala || Pan-STARRS ||  || align=right | 2.1 km || 
|-id=296 bgcolor=#d6d6d6
| 590296 ||  || — || August 1, 2016 || Haleakala || Pan-STARRS ||  || align=right | 2.1 km || 
|-id=297 bgcolor=#fefefe
| 590297 ||  || — || October 22, 2011 || Mount Lemmon || Mount Lemmon Survey ||  || align=right data-sort-value="0.57" | 570 m || 
|-id=298 bgcolor=#d6d6d6
| 590298 ||  || — || September 24, 2011 || Mount Lemmon || Mount Lemmon Survey ||  || align=right | 2.2 km || 
|-id=299 bgcolor=#d6d6d6
| 590299 ||  || — || May 21, 2014 || Haleakala || Pan-STARRS ||  || align=right | 1.9 km || 
|-id=300 bgcolor=#d6d6d6
| 590300 ||  || — || October 22, 2011 || Mount Lemmon || Mount Lemmon Survey ||  || align=right | 2.0 km || 
|}

590301–590400 

|-bgcolor=#E9E9E9
| 590301 ||  || — || October 19, 2011 || Mount Lemmon || Mount Lemmon Survey ||  || align=right | 2.0 km || 
|-id=302 bgcolor=#d6d6d6
| 590302 ||  || — || October 23, 2011 || Mount Lemmon || Mount Lemmon Survey ||  || align=right | 2.7 km || 
|-id=303 bgcolor=#d6d6d6
| 590303 ||  || — || October 23, 2011 || Haleakala || Pan-STARRS ||  || align=right | 2.0 km || 
|-id=304 bgcolor=#E9E9E9
| 590304 ||  || — || October 29, 2011 || Kitt Peak || Spacewatch ||  || align=right | 1.8 km || 
|-id=305 bgcolor=#d6d6d6
| 590305 ||  || — || October 24, 2011 || Mount Lemmon || Mount Lemmon Survey ||  || align=right | 1.9 km || 
|-id=306 bgcolor=#d6d6d6
| 590306 ||  || — || October 26, 2011 || Haleakala || Pan-STARRS ||  || align=right | 1.8 km || 
|-id=307 bgcolor=#d6d6d6
| 590307 ||  || — || October 20, 2011 || Kitt Peak || Spacewatch ||  || align=right | 1.9 km || 
|-id=308 bgcolor=#d6d6d6
| 590308 ||  || — || October 23, 2011 || Mount Lemmon || Mount Lemmon Survey ||  || align=right | 2.3 km || 
|-id=309 bgcolor=#d6d6d6
| 590309 ||  || — || October 19, 2011 || Mount Lemmon || Mount Lemmon Survey ||  || align=right | 2.3 km || 
|-id=310 bgcolor=#d6d6d6
| 590310 ||  || — || October 18, 2011 || Kitt Peak || Spacewatch ||  || align=right | 2.5 km || 
|-id=311 bgcolor=#d6d6d6
| 590311 ||  || — || March 26, 2004 || Kitt Peak || Spacewatch ||  || align=right | 2.9 km || 
|-id=312 bgcolor=#d6d6d6
| 590312 ||  || — || September 24, 2011 || Haleakala || Pan-STARRS ||  || align=right | 2.4 km || 
|-id=313 bgcolor=#d6d6d6
| 590313 ||  || — || October 31, 2011 || Kitt Peak || Spacewatch ||  || align=right | 2.1 km || 
|-id=314 bgcolor=#E9E9E9
| 590314 ||  || — || December 5, 2007 || Kitt Peak || Spacewatch ||  || align=right | 1.4 km || 
|-id=315 bgcolor=#d6d6d6
| 590315 ||  || — || October 31, 2011 || Bergisch Gladbach || W. Bickel || EOS || align=right | 1.6 km || 
|-id=316 bgcolor=#d6d6d6
| 590316 ||  || — || November 8, 2011 || Haleakala || Pan-STARRS ||  || align=right | 2.9 km || 
|-id=317 bgcolor=#d6d6d6
| 590317 ||  || — || November 2, 2011 || Mount Lemmon || Mount Lemmon Survey ||  || align=right | 1.9 km || 
|-id=318 bgcolor=#d6d6d6
| 590318 ||  || — || May 4, 2014 || Haleakala || Pan-STARRS ||  || align=right | 2.2 km || 
|-id=319 bgcolor=#d6d6d6
| 590319 ||  || — || November 2, 2011 || Mount Lemmon || Mount Lemmon Survey ||  || align=right | 2.0 km || 
|-id=320 bgcolor=#d6d6d6
| 590320 ||  || — || November 3, 2011 || Kitt Peak || Spacewatch ||  || align=right | 2.4 km || 
|-id=321 bgcolor=#d6d6d6
| 590321 ||  || — || November 2, 2011 || Mount Lemmon || Mount Lemmon Survey ||  || align=right | 2.1 km || 
|-id=322 bgcolor=#fefefe
| 590322 ||  || — || November 16, 2011 || Mount Lemmon || Mount Lemmon Survey ||  || align=right data-sort-value="0.56" | 560 m || 
|-id=323 bgcolor=#d6d6d6
| 590323 ||  || — || May 13, 2004 || Kitt Peak || Spacewatch ||  || align=right | 3.7 km || 
|-id=324 bgcolor=#d6d6d6
| 590324 ||  || — || December 19, 2001 || Palomar || NEAT ||  || align=right | 3.4 km || 
|-id=325 bgcolor=#fefefe
| 590325 ||  || — || October 24, 2011 || Haleakala || Pan-STARRS ||  || align=right data-sort-value="0.82" | 820 m || 
|-id=326 bgcolor=#d6d6d6
| 590326 ||  || — || September 23, 2011 || Mount Lemmon || Mount Lemmon Survey ||  || align=right | 2.2 km || 
|-id=327 bgcolor=#E9E9E9
| 590327 ||  || — || September 29, 2011 || Kitt Peak || Spacewatch ||  || align=right | 1.7 km || 
|-id=328 bgcolor=#d6d6d6
| 590328 ||  || — || September 6, 2010 || Piszkesteto || Z. Kuli ||  || align=right | 3.6 km || 
|-id=329 bgcolor=#d6d6d6
| 590329 ||  || — || September 12, 2005 || Kitt Peak || Spacewatch ||  || align=right | 2.1 km || 
|-id=330 bgcolor=#d6d6d6
| 590330 ||  || — || November 17, 2011 || Mount Lemmon || Mount Lemmon Survey ||  || align=right | 2.7 km || 
|-id=331 bgcolor=#d6d6d6
| 590331 ||  || — || November 16, 2006 || Kitt Peak || Spacewatch ||  || align=right | 2.3 km || 
|-id=332 bgcolor=#d6d6d6
| 590332 ||  || — || November 22, 2011 || Piszkesteto || A. Pál ||  || align=right | 2.5 km || 
|-id=333 bgcolor=#d6d6d6
| 590333 ||  || — || August 29, 2005 || Palomar || NEAT || EOS || align=right | 2.7 km || 
|-id=334 bgcolor=#E9E9E9
| 590334 ||  || — || November 15, 2011 || Kitt Peak || Spacewatch ||  || align=right | 2.6 km || 
|-id=335 bgcolor=#d6d6d6
| 590335 ||  || — || November 3, 2011 || Zelenchukskaya Stn || T. V. Kryachko, B. Satovski ||  || align=right | 3.1 km || 
|-id=336 bgcolor=#fefefe
| 590336 ||  || — || October 15, 2001 || Palomar || NEAT ||  || align=right data-sort-value="0.57" | 570 m || 
|-id=337 bgcolor=#d6d6d6
| 590337 ||  || — || May 23, 2003 || Kitt Peak || Spacewatch ||  || align=right | 3.7 km || 
|-id=338 bgcolor=#d6d6d6
| 590338 ||  || — || September 1, 2005 || Palomar || NEAT ||  || align=right | 3.4 km || 
|-id=339 bgcolor=#d6d6d6
| 590339 ||  || — || November 19, 2011 || Mount Lemmon || Mount Lemmon Survey ||  || align=right | 2.4 km || 
|-id=340 bgcolor=#d6d6d6
| 590340 ||  || — || September 3, 2010 || La Sagra || OAM Obs. ||  || align=right | 3.5 km || 
|-id=341 bgcolor=#d6d6d6
| 590341 ||  || — || October 25, 2011 || Haleakala || Pan-STARRS ||  || align=right | 2.5 km || 
|-id=342 bgcolor=#d6d6d6
| 590342 ||  || — || October 26, 2011 || Haleakala || Pan-STARRS ||  || align=right | 2.2 km || 
|-id=343 bgcolor=#d6d6d6
| 590343 ||  || — || April 18, 2009 || Mount Lemmon || Mount Lemmon Survey ||  || align=right | 2.6 km || 
|-id=344 bgcolor=#d6d6d6
| 590344 ||  || — || November 2, 2006 || Bergisch Gladbach || W. Bickel ||  || align=right | 1.7 km || 
|-id=345 bgcolor=#d6d6d6
| 590345 ||  || — || October 16, 2006 || Catalina || CSS ||  || align=right | 1.9 km || 
|-id=346 bgcolor=#d6d6d6
| 590346 ||  || — || November 23, 2006 || Kitt Peak || Spacewatch || NAE || align=right | 1.9 km || 
|-id=347 bgcolor=#E9E9E9
| 590347 ||  || — || October 19, 2011 || Mount Lemmon || Mount Lemmon Survey ||  || align=right | 2.2 km || 
|-id=348 bgcolor=#d6d6d6
| 590348 ||  || — || November 3, 2011 || Mount Lemmon || Mount Lemmon Survey ||  || align=right | 2.7 km || 
|-id=349 bgcolor=#fefefe
| 590349 ||  || — || October 25, 2011 || Haleakala || Pan-STARRS || H || align=right data-sort-value="0.50" | 500 m || 
|-id=350 bgcolor=#d6d6d6
| 590350 ||  || — || November 18, 2011 || Catalina || CSS ||  || align=right | 2.1 km || 
|-id=351 bgcolor=#d6d6d6
| 590351 ||  || — || October 21, 2011 || Mount Lemmon || Mount Lemmon Survey ||  || align=right | 2.1 km || 
|-id=352 bgcolor=#C2FFFF
| 590352 ||  || — || November 1, 2011 || Mount Lemmon || Mount Lemmon Survey || L4 || align=right | 10 km || 
|-id=353 bgcolor=#d6d6d6
| 590353 ||  || — || September 22, 1995 || Kitt Peak || Spacewatch ||  || align=right | 2.6 km || 
|-id=354 bgcolor=#d6d6d6
| 590354 ||  || — || October 23, 2011 || Haleakala || Pan-STARRS ||  || align=right | 2.0 km || 
|-id=355 bgcolor=#d6d6d6
| 590355 ||  || — || October 29, 2011 || Kitt Peak || Spacewatch ||  || align=right | 2.2 km || 
|-id=356 bgcolor=#d6d6d6
| 590356 ||  || — || April 29, 2008 || Kitt Peak || Spacewatch ||  || align=right | 2.7 km || 
|-id=357 bgcolor=#d6d6d6
| 590357 ||  || — || November 25, 2011 || Haleakala || Pan-STARRS ||  || align=right | 3.2 km || 
|-id=358 bgcolor=#fefefe
| 590358 ||  || — || November 4, 2007 || Kitt Peak || Spacewatch ||  || align=right data-sort-value="0.77" | 770 m || 
|-id=359 bgcolor=#d6d6d6
| 590359 ||  || — || April 23, 2014 || Haleakala || Pan-STARRS ||  || align=right | 2.1 km || 
|-id=360 bgcolor=#E9E9E9
| 590360 ||  || — || November 18, 2011 || Mount Lemmon || Mount Lemmon Survey ||  || align=right data-sort-value="0.83" | 830 m || 
|-id=361 bgcolor=#d6d6d6
| 590361 ||  || — || March 20, 2002 || Socorro || LINEAR ||  || align=right | 3.6 km || 
|-id=362 bgcolor=#d6d6d6
| 590362 ||  || — || October 26, 2011 || Haleakala || Pan-STARRS ||  || align=right | 2.4 km || 
|-id=363 bgcolor=#d6d6d6
| 590363 ||  || — || March 10, 2008 || Mount Lemmon || Mount Lemmon Survey ||  || align=right | 2.3 km || 
|-id=364 bgcolor=#C2FFFF
| 590364 ||  || — || October 29, 2010 || Kitt Peak || Spacewatch || L4 || align=right | 8.6 km || 
|-id=365 bgcolor=#d6d6d6
| 590365 ||  || — || November 26, 2011 || Mount Lemmon || Mount Lemmon Survey ||  || align=right | 3.2 km || 
|-id=366 bgcolor=#d6d6d6
| 590366 ||  || — || November 18, 2011 || Mount Lemmon || Mount Lemmon Survey ||  || align=right | 2.3 km || 
|-id=367 bgcolor=#d6d6d6
| 590367 ||  || — || November 17, 2011 || Kitt Peak || Spacewatch ||  || align=right | 2.9 km || 
|-id=368 bgcolor=#d6d6d6
| 590368 ||  || — || November 24, 2011 || Haleakala || Pan-STARRS ||  || align=right | 2.6 km || 
|-id=369 bgcolor=#d6d6d6
| 590369 ||  || — || October 7, 2016 || Haleakala || Pan-STARRS ||  || align=right | 2.5 km || 
|-id=370 bgcolor=#d6d6d6
| 590370 ||  || — || November 24, 2011 || Haleakala || Pan-STARRS ||  || align=right | 2.9 km || 
|-id=371 bgcolor=#d6d6d6
| 590371 ||  || — || December 1, 2011 || Haleakala || Pan-STARRS ||  || align=right | 2.1 km || 
|-id=372 bgcolor=#d6d6d6
| 590372 ||  || — || October 13, 2005 || Kitt Peak || Spacewatch ||  || align=right | 2.0 km || 
|-id=373 bgcolor=#d6d6d6
| 590373 ||  || — || February 7, 2013 || Kitt Peak || Spacewatch ||  || align=right | 2.1 km || 
|-id=374 bgcolor=#d6d6d6
| 590374 ||  || — || December 1, 2011 || Haleakala || Pan-STARRS ||  || align=right | 1.9 km || 
|-id=375 bgcolor=#C2FFFF
| 590375 ||  || — || December 6, 2011 || Haleakala || Pan-STARRS || L4 || align=right | 6.4 km || 
|-id=376 bgcolor=#C2FFFF
| 590376 ||  || — || November 24, 2011 || Mount Lemmon || Mount Lemmon Survey || L4 || align=right | 11 km || 
|-id=377 bgcolor=#d6d6d6
| 590377 ||  || — || January 21, 2007 || Mauna Kea || Mauna Kea Obs. ||  || align=right | 3.0 km || 
|-id=378 bgcolor=#d6d6d6
| 590378 ||  || — || February 7, 2002 || Palomar || NEAT ||  || align=right | 3.4 km || 
|-id=379 bgcolor=#C2FFFF
| 590379 ||  || — || July 29, 2008 || Mount Lemmon || Mount Lemmon Survey || L4 || align=right | 7.0 km || 
|-id=380 bgcolor=#d6d6d6
| 590380 ||  || — || July 5, 2005 || Palomar || NEAT ||  || align=right | 2.5 km || 
|-id=381 bgcolor=#d6d6d6
| 590381 ||  || — || October 22, 2006 || Mount Lemmon || Mount Lemmon Survey ||  || align=right | 2.8 km || 
|-id=382 bgcolor=#d6d6d6
| 590382 ||  || — || January 17, 2001 || Haleakala || AMOS ||  || align=right | 4.2 km || 
|-id=383 bgcolor=#fefefe
| 590383 ||  || — || December 26, 2011 || Les Engarouines || L. Bernasconi ||  || align=right data-sort-value="0.91" | 910 m || 
|-id=384 bgcolor=#fefefe
| 590384 ||  || — || January 7, 2005 || Kitt Peak || Spacewatch ||  || align=right data-sort-value="0.58" | 580 m || 
|-id=385 bgcolor=#d6d6d6
| 590385 ||  || — || January 30, 2001 || Haleakala || AMOS ||  || align=right | 3.8 km || 
|-id=386 bgcolor=#d6d6d6
| 590386 ||  || — || December 26, 2011 || Mount Lemmon || Mount Lemmon Survey ||  || align=right | 2.4 km || 
|-id=387 bgcolor=#d6d6d6
| 590387 ||  || — || February 21, 2007 || Mount Lemmon || Mount Lemmon Survey ||  || align=right | 2.3 km || 
|-id=388 bgcolor=#d6d6d6
| 590388 ||  || — || December 27, 2011 || Kitt Peak || Spacewatch ||  || align=right | 2.6 km || 
|-id=389 bgcolor=#C2FFFF
| 590389 ||  || — || December 28, 2011 || Oukaimeden || M. Ory || L4 || align=right | 7.9 km || 
|-id=390 bgcolor=#d6d6d6
| 590390 ||  || — || December 29, 2011 || Kitt Peak || Spacewatch ||  || align=right | 3.2 km || 
|-id=391 bgcolor=#fefefe
| 590391 ||  || — || March 1, 2009 || Mount Lemmon || Mount Lemmon Survey ||  || align=right data-sort-value="0.71" | 710 m || 
|-id=392 bgcolor=#fefefe
| 590392 ||  || — || June 18, 2010 || Mount Lemmon || Mount Lemmon Survey ||  || align=right data-sort-value="0.70" | 700 m || 
|-id=393 bgcolor=#d6d6d6
| 590393 ||  || — || January 27, 2007 || Mount Lemmon || Mount Lemmon Survey ||  || align=right | 2.5 km || 
|-id=394 bgcolor=#d6d6d6
| 590394 ||  || — || May 1, 2008 || Kitt Peak || Spacewatch ||  || align=right | 3.0 km || 
|-id=395 bgcolor=#fefefe
| 590395 ||  || — || June 4, 2005 || Kitt Peak || Spacewatch || H || align=right data-sort-value="0.72" | 720 m || 
|-id=396 bgcolor=#E9E9E9
| 590396 ||  || — || October 21, 2006 || Mount Lemmon || Mount Lemmon Survey ||  || align=right | 2.1 km || 
|-id=397 bgcolor=#d6d6d6
| 590397 ||  || — || July 5, 2003 || Kitt Peak || Spacewatch ||  || align=right | 5.5 km || 
|-id=398 bgcolor=#d6d6d6
| 590398 ||  || — || November 1, 2005 || Mount Lemmon || Mount Lemmon Survey ||  || align=right | 3.2 km || 
|-id=399 bgcolor=#d6d6d6
| 590399 ||  || — || December 16, 2011 || Mount Lemmon || Mount Lemmon Survey ||  || align=right | 2.9 km || 
|-id=400 bgcolor=#fefefe
| 590400 ||  || — || December 1, 2011 || Charleston || R. Holmes ||  || align=right data-sort-value="0.53" | 530 m || 
|}

590401–590500 

|-bgcolor=#C2FFFF
| 590401 ||  || — || December 29, 2011 || Kitt Peak || Spacewatch || L4 || align=right | 9.5 km || 
|-id=402 bgcolor=#fefefe
| 590402 ||  || — || December 28, 2011 || Catalina || CSS ||  || align=right data-sort-value="0.85" | 850 m || 
|-id=403 bgcolor=#fefefe
| 590403 ||  || — || January 4, 2012 || Mount Lemmon || Mount Lemmon Survey ||  || align=right data-sort-value="0.84" | 840 m || 
|-id=404 bgcolor=#C2FFFF
| 590404 ||  || — || January 10, 2013 || Haleakala || Pan-STARRS || L4 || align=right | 8.0 km || 
|-id=405 bgcolor=#fefefe
| 590405 ||  || — || December 26, 2011 || Kitt Peak || Spacewatch ||  || align=right data-sort-value="0.65" | 650 m || 
|-id=406 bgcolor=#d6d6d6
| 590406 ||  || — || November 10, 2016 || Mount Lemmon || Mount Lemmon Survey ||  || align=right | 3.0 km || 
|-id=407 bgcolor=#d6d6d6
| 590407 ||  || — || May 6, 2014 || Haleakala || Pan-STARRS ||  || align=right | 2.5 km || 
|-id=408 bgcolor=#d6d6d6
| 590408 ||  || — || December 27, 2011 || Mount Lemmon || Mount Lemmon Survey || Tj (2.99) || align=right | 2.5 km || 
|-id=409 bgcolor=#d6d6d6
| 590409 ||  || — || December 30, 2011 || Mount Lemmon || Mount Lemmon Survey ||  || align=right | 2.0 km || 
|-id=410 bgcolor=#d6d6d6
| 590410 ||  || — || December 24, 2011 || Mount Lemmon || Mount Lemmon Survey ||  || align=right | 2.4 km || 
|-id=411 bgcolor=#d6d6d6
| 590411 ||  || — || October 13, 2016 || Mount Lemmon || Mount Lemmon Survey ||  || align=right | 2.8 km || 
|-id=412 bgcolor=#d6d6d6
| 590412 ||  || — || September 8, 2016 || Haleakala || Pan-STARRS ||  || align=right | 2.6 km || 
|-id=413 bgcolor=#fefefe
| 590413 ||  || — || January 18, 2016 || Haleakala || Pan-STARRS ||  || align=right data-sort-value="0.58" | 580 m || 
|-id=414 bgcolor=#C2FFFF
| 590414 ||  || — || December 29, 2011 || Mount Lemmon || Mount Lemmon Survey || L4 || align=right | 8.4 km || 
|-id=415 bgcolor=#fefefe
| 590415 ||  || — || June 30, 2013 || Haleakala || Pan-STARRS || H || align=right data-sort-value="0.60" | 600 m || 
|-id=416 bgcolor=#d6d6d6
| 590416 ||  || — || July 24, 2015 || Haleakala || Pan-STARRS ||  || align=right | 2.2 km || 
|-id=417 bgcolor=#C2FFFF
| 590417 ||  || — || December 24, 2011 || Mount Lemmon || Mount Lemmon Survey || L4 || align=right | 8.8 km || 
|-id=418 bgcolor=#C2FFFF
| 590418 ||  || — || December 27, 2011 || Kitt Peak || Spacewatch || L4 || align=right | 8.9 km || 
|-id=419 bgcolor=#C2FFFF
| 590419 ||  || — || June 18, 2018 || Haleakala || Pan-STARRS || L4 || align=right | 7.3 km || 
|-id=420 bgcolor=#d6d6d6
| 590420 ||  || — || December 28, 2011 || Kitt Peak || Spacewatch ||  || align=right | 2.7 km || 
|-id=421 bgcolor=#C2FFFF
| 590421 ||  || — || December 31, 2011 || Kitt Peak || Spacewatch || L4 || align=right | 6.5 km || 
|-id=422 bgcolor=#C2FFFF
| 590422 ||  || — || December 26, 2011 || Kitt Peak || Spacewatch || L4 || align=right | 6.9 km || 
|-id=423 bgcolor=#d6d6d6
| 590423 ||  || — || December 29, 2011 || Mount Lemmon || Mount Lemmon Survey ||  || align=right | 3.9 km || 
|-id=424 bgcolor=#d6d6d6
| 590424 ||  || — || December 29, 2011 || Mount Lemmon || Mount Lemmon Survey ||  || align=right | 2.9 km || 
|-id=425 bgcolor=#d6d6d6
| 590425 ||  || — || December 26, 2011 || Kitt Peak || Spacewatch ||  || align=right | 2.6 km || 
|-id=426 bgcolor=#C2FFFF
| 590426 ||  || — || December 27, 2011 || Mount Lemmon || Mount Lemmon Survey || L4 || align=right | 7.4 km || 
|-id=427 bgcolor=#d6d6d6
| 590427 ||  || — || January 1, 2012 || Mount Lemmon || Mount Lemmon Survey ||  || align=right | 3.2 km || 
|-id=428 bgcolor=#d6d6d6
| 590428 ||  || — || December 21, 2011 || ESA OGS || ESA OGS ||  || align=right | 2.7 km || 
|-id=429 bgcolor=#d6d6d6
| 590429 ||  || — || December 7, 2005 || Kitt Peak || Spacewatch ||  || align=right | 2.9 km || 
|-id=430 bgcolor=#C2FFFF
| 590430 ||  || — || September 9, 2008 || Mount Lemmon || Mount Lemmon Survey || L4 || align=right | 8.0 km || 
|-id=431 bgcolor=#d6d6d6
| 590431 ||  || — || January 2, 2012 || Kitt Peak || Spacewatch ||  || align=right | 3.3 km || 
|-id=432 bgcolor=#d6d6d6
| 590432 ||  || — || January 1, 2012 || Mount Lemmon || Mount Lemmon Survey ||  || align=right | 2.7 km || 
|-id=433 bgcolor=#d6d6d6
| 590433 ||  || — || January 5, 2012 || Kitt Peak || Spacewatch ||  || align=right | 2.5 km || 
|-id=434 bgcolor=#fefefe
| 590434 ||  || — || November 2, 2000 || Kitt Peak || Spacewatch ||  || align=right data-sort-value="0.64" | 640 m || 
|-id=435 bgcolor=#C2FFFF
| 590435 ||  || — || December 27, 2011 || Mount Lemmon || Mount Lemmon Survey || L4 || align=right | 8.2 km || 
|-id=436 bgcolor=#fefefe
| 590436 ||  || — || November 2, 2007 || Mount Lemmon || Mount Lemmon Survey ||  || align=right data-sort-value="0.78" | 780 m || 
|-id=437 bgcolor=#d6d6d6
| 590437 ||  || — || January 2, 2012 || Kitt Peak || Spacewatch ||  || align=right | 2.8 km || 
|-id=438 bgcolor=#C2FFFF
| 590438 ||  || — || January 3, 2012 || Mount Lemmon || Mount Lemmon Survey || L4 || align=right | 8.3 km || 
|-id=439 bgcolor=#fefefe
| 590439 ||  || — || September 18, 2003 || Palomar || NEAT ||  || align=right | 1.2 km || 
|-id=440 bgcolor=#d6d6d6
| 590440 ||  || — || October 31, 2005 || Catalina || CSS ||  || align=right | 3.3 km || 
|-id=441 bgcolor=#d6d6d6
| 590441 ||  || — || October 9, 2016 || Haleakala || Pan-STARRS ||  || align=right | 3.1 km || 
|-id=442 bgcolor=#d6d6d6
| 590442 ||  || — || June 5, 2014 || Haleakala || Pan-STARRS ||  || align=right | 2.6 km || 
|-id=443 bgcolor=#d6d6d6
| 590443 ||  || — || October 21, 2016 || Mount Lemmon || Mount Lemmon Survey ||  || align=right | 2.6 km || 
|-id=444 bgcolor=#d6d6d6
| 590444 ||  || — || January 2, 2012 || Kitt Peak || Spacewatch ||  || align=right | 2.5 km || 
|-id=445 bgcolor=#d6d6d6
| 590445 ||  || — || January 2, 2012 || Kitt Peak || Spacewatch ||  || align=right | 2.4 km || 
|-id=446 bgcolor=#d6d6d6
| 590446 ||  || — || January 1, 2012 || Mount Lemmon || Mount Lemmon Survey ||  || align=right | 2.9 km || 
|-id=447 bgcolor=#fefefe
| 590447 ||  || — || January 1, 2012 || Mount Lemmon || Mount Lemmon Survey ||  || align=right data-sort-value="0.61" | 610 m || 
|-id=448 bgcolor=#d6d6d6
| 590448 ||  || — || October 25, 2011 || Mount Lemmon || Mount Lemmon Survey ||  || align=right | 3.8 km || 
|-id=449 bgcolor=#fefefe
| 590449 ||  || — || January 19, 2012 || Haleakala || Pan-STARRS || H || align=right data-sort-value="0.55" | 550 m || 
|-id=450 bgcolor=#C2FFFF
| 590450 ||  || — || December 27, 2011 || Kitt Peak || Spacewatch || L4 || align=right | 7.5 km || 
|-id=451 bgcolor=#d6d6d6
| 590451 ||  || — || September 18, 2010 || Mount Lemmon || Mount Lemmon Survey ||  || align=right | 2.7 km || 
|-id=452 bgcolor=#d6d6d6
| 590452 ||  || — || November 23, 2006 || Mount Lemmon || Mount Lemmon Survey ||  || align=right | 3.6 km || 
|-id=453 bgcolor=#d6d6d6
| 590453 ||  || — || February 10, 2007 || Mount Lemmon || Mount Lemmon Survey ||  || align=right | 3.4 km || 
|-id=454 bgcolor=#d6d6d6
| 590454 ||  || — || November 26, 2005 || Catalina || CSS ||  || align=right | 2.3 km || 
|-id=455 bgcolor=#d6d6d6
| 590455 ||  || — || August 31, 2005 || Palomar || NEAT ||  || align=right | 2.9 km || 
|-id=456 bgcolor=#d6d6d6
| 590456 ||  || — || January 2, 2012 || Mount Lemmon || Mount Lemmon Survey || 7:4 || align=right | 3.0 km || 
|-id=457 bgcolor=#d6d6d6
| 590457 ||  || — || January 19, 2012 || Mount Lemmon || Mount Lemmon Survey ||  || align=right | 2.5 km || 
|-id=458 bgcolor=#fefefe
| 590458 ||  || — || January 3, 2012 || Kitt Peak || Spacewatch ||  || align=right data-sort-value="0.70" | 700 m || 
|-id=459 bgcolor=#fefefe
| 590459 ||  || — || January 19, 2012 || Mount Lemmon || Mount Lemmon Survey ||  || align=right data-sort-value="0.56" | 560 m || 
|-id=460 bgcolor=#C2FFFF
| 590460 ||  || — || December 27, 2011 || Mount Lemmon || Mount Lemmon Survey || L4 || align=right | 5.6 km || 
|-id=461 bgcolor=#fefefe
| 590461 ||  || — || September 4, 2010 || Mount Lemmon || Mount Lemmon Survey ||  || align=right data-sort-value="0.76" | 760 m || 
|-id=462 bgcolor=#fefefe
| 590462 ||  || — || December 18, 2003 || Kitt Peak || Spacewatch ||  || align=right data-sort-value="0.91" | 910 m || 
|-id=463 bgcolor=#d6d6d6
| 590463 ||  || — || January 4, 2012 || Mount Lemmon || Mount Lemmon Survey ||  || align=right | 3.2 km || 
|-id=464 bgcolor=#d6d6d6
| 590464 ||  || — || January 23, 2012 || Mayhill || N. Falla ||  || align=right | 2.4 km || 
|-id=465 bgcolor=#C2FFFF
| 590465 ||  || — || January 24, 2012 || Haleakala || Pan-STARRS || L4 || align=right | 7.4 km || 
|-id=466 bgcolor=#C2FFFF
| 590466 ||  || — || September 30, 2009 || Mount Lemmon || Mount Lemmon Survey || L4 || align=right | 6.9 km || 
|-id=467 bgcolor=#d6d6d6
| 590467 ||  || — || January 20, 2012 || Mount Lemmon || Mount Lemmon Survey ||  || align=right | 2.9 km || 
|-id=468 bgcolor=#fefefe
| 590468 ||  || — || January 21, 2012 || Kitt Peak || Spacewatch ||  || align=right data-sort-value="0.56" | 560 m || 
|-id=469 bgcolor=#d6d6d6
| 590469 ||  || — || January 21, 2012 || Kitt Peak || Spacewatch ||  || align=right | 3.0 km || 
|-id=470 bgcolor=#fefefe
| 590470 ||  || — || January 21, 2012 || Catalina || CSS ||  || align=right data-sort-value="0.52" | 520 m || 
|-id=471 bgcolor=#fefefe
| 590471 ||  || — || September 19, 2010 || Mount Lemmon || Mount Lemmon Survey ||  || align=right data-sort-value="0.70" | 700 m || 
|-id=472 bgcolor=#d6d6d6
| 590472 ||  || — || January 23, 2012 || Oukaimeden || M. Ory || EOS || align=right | 1.9 km || 
|-id=473 bgcolor=#fefefe
| 590473 ||  || — || January 18, 2008 || Mount Lemmon || Mount Lemmon Survey ||  || align=right data-sort-value="0.86" | 860 m || 
|-id=474 bgcolor=#fefefe
| 590474 ||  || — || September 25, 2007 || Mount Lemmon || Mount Lemmon Survey ||  || align=right data-sort-value="0.62" | 620 m || 
|-id=475 bgcolor=#fefefe
| 590475 ||  || — || March 18, 2001 || Kitt Peak || Spacewatch ||  || align=right data-sort-value="0.64" | 640 m || 
|-id=476 bgcolor=#fefefe
| 590476 ||  || — || January 27, 2012 || Mount Lemmon || Mount Lemmon Survey ||  || align=right data-sort-value="0.56" | 560 m || 
|-id=477 bgcolor=#d6d6d6
| 590477 ||  || — || January 27, 2012 || Mount Lemmon || Mount Lemmon Survey ||  || align=right | 2.1 km || 
|-id=478 bgcolor=#d6d6d6
| 590478 ||  || — || January 27, 2012 || Mount Lemmon || Mount Lemmon Survey ||  || align=right | 2.8 km || 
|-id=479 bgcolor=#d6d6d6
| 590479 ||  || — || January 18, 2012 || Bergisch Gladbach || W. Bickel ||  || align=right | 2.2 km || 
|-id=480 bgcolor=#fefefe
| 590480 ||  || — || April 20, 2002 || Palomar || NEAT || H || align=right data-sort-value="0.85" | 850 m || 
|-id=481 bgcolor=#d6d6d6
| 590481 ||  || — || December 29, 2011 || Kitt Peak || Spacewatch ||  || align=right | 2.6 km || 
|-id=482 bgcolor=#d6d6d6
| 590482 ||  || — || January 27, 2012 || Kitt Peak || Spacewatch ||  || align=right | 2.7 km || 
|-id=483 bgcolor=#C2FFFF
| 590483 ||  || — || December 2, 2010 || Mount Lemmon || Mount Lemmon Survey || L4 || align=right | 6.8 km || 
|-id=484 bgcolor=#fefefe
| 590484 ||  || — || December 24, 2011 || Mount Lemmon || Mount Lemmon Survey || H || align=right data-sort-value="0.57" | 570 m || 
|-id=485 bgcolor=#C2FFFF
| 590485 ||  || — || September 2, 2008 || Kitt Peak || Spacewatch || L4 || align=right | 6.2 km || 
|-id=486 bgcolor=#d6d6d6
| 590486 ||  || — || January 26, 2012 || Haleakala || Pan-STARRS ||  || align=right | 2.6 km || 
|-id=487 bgcolor=#fefefe
| 590487 ||  || — || January 27, 2012 || Kitt Peak || Spacewatch ||  || align=right data-sort-value="0.60" | 600 m || 
|-id=488 bgcolor=#d6d6d6
| 590488 ||  || — || January 27, 2012 || Mount Lemmon || Mount Lemmon Survey ||  || align=right | 2.5 km || 
|-id=489 bgcolor=#fefefe
| 590489 ||  || — || January 27, 2012 || Mount Lemmon || Mount Lemmon Survey ||  || align=right data-sort-value="0.71" | 710 m || 
|-id=490 bgcolor=#fefefe
| 590490 ||  || — || January 27, 2012 || Mount Lemmon || Mount Lemmon Survey || NYS || align=right data-sort-value="0.58" | 580 m || 
|-id=491 bgcolor=#fefefe
| 590491 ||  || — || January 27, 2012 || Mount Lemmon || Mount Lemmon Survey ||  || align=right data-sort-value="0.64" | 640 m || 
|-id=492 bgcolor=#C2FFFF
| 590492 ||  || — || January 27, 2012 || Mount Lemmon || Mount Lemmon Survey || L4 || align=right | 6.4 km || 
|-id=493 bgcolor=#d6d6d6
| 590493 ||  || — || January 27, 2012 || Mount Lemmon || Mount Lemmon Survey ||  || align=right | 2.8 km || 
|-id=494 bgcolor=#C2FFFF
| 590494 ||  || — || January 28, 2012 || Haleakala || Pan-STARRS || L4 || align=right | 7.4 km || 
|-id=495 bgcolor=#fefefe
| 590495 ||  || — || January 29, 2012 || Kitt Peak || Spacewatch ||  || align=right data-sort-value="0.60" | 600 m || 
|-id=496 bgcolor=#d6d6d6
| 590496 ||  || — || October 11, 2010 || Mount Lemmon || Mount Lemmon Survey ||  || align=right | 2.9 km || 
|-id=497 bgcolor=#d6d6d6
| 590497 ||  || — || December 27, 2011 || Mount Lemmon || Mount Lemmon Survey ||  || align=right | 2.4 km || 
|-id=498 bgcolor=#fefefe
| 590498 ||  || — || January 30, 2012 || Kitt Peak || Spacewatch ||  || align=right data-sort-value="0.58" | 580 m || 
|-id=499 bgcolor=#fefefe
| 590499 ||  || — || January 18, 2004 || Palomar || NEAT || H || align=right data-sort-value="0.85" | 850 m || 
|-id=500 bgcolor=#fefefe
| 590500 ||  || — || January 25, 2012 || Haleakala || Pan-STARRS || H || align=right data-sort-value="0.70" | 700 m || 
|}

590501–590600 

|-bgcolor=#fefefe
| 590501 ||  || — || November 15, 2003 || Kitt Peak || Spacewatch ||  || align=right data-sort-value="0.98" | 980 m || 
|-id=502 bgcolor=#fefefe
| 590502 ||  || — || January 26, 2012 || Mount Lemmon || Mount Lemmon Survey ||  || align=right data-sort-value="0.58" | 580 m || 
|-id=503 bgcolor=#fefefe
| 590503 ||  || — || January 1, 2012 || Mount Lemmon || Mount Lemmon Survey ||  || align=right data-sort-value="0.56" | 560 m || 
|-id=504 bgcolor=#d6d6d6
| 590504 ||  || — || September 19, 2010 || Kitt Peak || Spacewatch ||  || align=right | 2.6 km || 
|-id=505 bgcolor=#d6d6d6
| 590505 ||  || — || January 26, 2012 || Mount Lemmon || Mount Lemmon Survey ||  || align=right | 2.8 km || 
|-id=506 bgcolor=#fefefe
| 590506 ||  || — || November 13, 2007 || Mount Lemmon || Mount Lemmon Survey ||  || align=right data-sort-value="0.71" | 710 m || 
|-id=507 bgcolor=#E9E9E9
| 590507 ||  || — || January 20, 2012 || Kitt Peak || Spacewatch ||  || align=right data-sort-value="0.86" | 860 m || 
|-id=508 bgcolor=#d6d6d6
| 590508 ||  || — || October 13, 2010 || Mount Lemmon || Mount Lemmon Survey ||  || align=right | 3.2 km || 
|-id=509 bgcolor=#d6d6d6
| 590509 ||  || — || January 8, 2006 || Kitt Peak || Spacewatch ||  || align=right | 2.4 km || 
|-id=510 bgcolor=#d6d6d6
| 590510 ||  || — || February 21, 2007 || Mount Lemmon || Mount Lemmon Survey ||  || align=right | 3.0 km || 
|-id=511 bgcolor=#d6d6d6
| 590511 ||  || — || January 26, 2012 || Mount Lemmon || Mount Lemmon Survey ||  || align=right | 2.6 km || 
|-id=512 bgcolor=#d6d6d6
| 590512 ||  || — || January 19, 2012 || Kitt Peak || Spacewatch ||  || align=right | 2.5 km || 
|-id=513 bgcolor=#d6d6d6
| 590513 ||  || — || April 14, 2013 || Mount Lemmon || Mount Lemmon Survey ||  || align=right | 2.4 km || 
|-id=514 bgcolor=#d6d6d6
| 590514 ||  || — || October 7, 2016 || Haleakala || Pan-STARRS ||  || align=right | 2.4 km || 
|-id=515 bgcolor=#d6d6d6
| 590515 ||  || — || January 18, 2012 || Catalina || CSS ||  || align=right | 2.9 km || 
|-id=516 bgcolor=#E9E9E9
| 590516 ||  || — || February 13, 2008 || Mount Lemmon || Mount Lemmon Survey ||  || align=right data-sort-value="0.54" | 540 m || 
|-id=517 bgcolor=#d6d6d6
| 590517 ||  || — || November 25, 2016 || Mount Lemmon || Mount Lemmon Survey ||  || align=right | 2.4 km || 
|-id=518 bgcolor=#d6d6d6
| 590518 ||  || — || August 11, 2015 || Haleakala || Pan-STARRS ||  || align=right | 2.8 km || 
|-id=519 bgcolor=#d6d6d6
| 590519 ||  || — || January 27, 2012 || Mount Lemmon || Mount Lemmon Survey ||  || align=right | 2.4 km || 
|-id=520 bgcolor=#d6d6d6
| 590520 ||  || — || December 2, 2016 || Mount Lemmon || Mount Lemmon Survey ||  || align=right | 2.3 km || 
|-id=521 bgcolor=#fefefe
| 590521 ||  || — || November 5, 2016 || Mount Lemmon || Mount Lemmon Survey || H || align=right data-sort-value="0.51" | 510 m || 
|-id=522 bgcolor=#fefefe
| 590522 ||  || — || January 27, 2012 || Mount Lemmon || Mount Lemmon Survey ||  || align=right data-sort-value="0.67" | 670 m || 
|-id=523 bgcolor=#d6d6d6
| 590523 ||  || — || January 18, 2012 || Kitt Peak || Spacewatch ||  || align=right | 2.7 km || 
|-id=524 bgcolor=#C2FFFF
| 590524 ||  || — || January 27, 2012 || Mount Lemmon || Mount Lemmon Survey || L4 || align=right | 6.2 km || 
|-id=525 bgcolor=#C2FFFF
| 590525 ||  || — || January 30, 2012 || Mount Lemmon || Mount Lemmon Survey || L4 || align=right | 7.3 km || 
|-id=526 bgcolor=#d6d6d6
| 590526 ||  || — || January 21, 2012 || Kitt Peak || Spacewatch ||  || align=right | 2.4 km || 
|-id=527 bgcolor=#d6d6d6
| 590527 ||  || — || October 29, 2005 || Kitt Peak || Spacewatch ||  || align=right | 2.5 km || 
|-id=528 bgcolor=#fefefe
| 590528 ||  || — || February 3, 2012 || Haleakala || Pan-STARRS ||  || align=right data-sort-value="0.68" | 680 m || 
|-id=529 bgcolor=#fefefe
| 590529 ||  || — || February 3, 2012 || Haleakala || Pan-STARRS ||  || align=right data-sort-value="0.69" | 690 m || 
|-id=530 bgcolor=#d6d6d6
| 590530 ||  || — || January 21, 2012 || Kitt Peak || Spacewatch ||  || align=right | 3.1 km || 
|-id=531 bgcolor=#d6d6d6
| 590531 ||  || — || November 30, 2000 || Apache Point || SDSS Collaboration ||  || align=right | 3.6 km || 
|-id=532 bgcolor=#FA8072
| 590532 ||  || — || February 12, 2012 || Haleakala || Pan-STARRS || H || align=right data-sort-value="0.53" | 530 m || 
|-id=533 bgcolor=#d6d6d6
| 590533 ||  || — || January 19, 2012 || Haleakala || Pan-STARRS ||  || align=right | 2.4 km || 
|-id=534 bgcolor=#fefefe
| 590534 ||  || — || February 13, 2012 || Haleakala || Pan-STARRS ||  || align=right data-sort-value="0.72" | 720 m || 
|-id=535 bgcolor=#d6d6d6
| 590535 ||  || — || January 21, 2012 || Kitt Peak || Spacewatch ||  || align=right | 2.4 km || 
|-id=536 bgcolor=#fefefe
| 590536 ||  || — || January 26, 2012 || Haleakala || Pan-STARRS ||  || align=right data-sort-value="0.49" | 490 m || 
|-id=537 bgcolor=#fefefe
| 590537 ||  || — || January 29, 2012 || Kitt Peak || Spacewatch ||  || align=right data-sort-value="0.55" | 550 m || 
|-id=538 bgcolor=#d6d6d6
| 590538 ||  || — || January 21, 2012 || Kitt Peak || Spacewatch ||  || align=right | 2.5 km || 
|-id=539 bgcolor=#fefefe
| 590539 ||  || — || October 9, 2007 || Kitt Peak || Spacewatch ||  || align=right data-sort-value="0.63" | 630 m || 
|-id=540 bgcolor=#d6d6d6
| 590540 ||  || — || February 17, 2007 || Kitt Peak || Spacewatch ||  || align=right | 3.1 km || 
|-id=541 bgcolor=#fefefe
| 590541 ||  || — || April 24, 2001 || Kitt Peak || Spacewatch || MAS || align=right data-sort-value="0.93" | 930 m || 
|-id=542 bgcolor=#E9E9E9
| 590542 ||  || — || October 22, 2005 || Kitt Peak || Spacewatch ||  || align=right | 2.4 km || 
|-id=543 bgcolor=#d6d6d6
| 590543 ||  || — || February 13, 2012 || Haleakala || Pan-STARRS ||  || align=right | 2.8 km || 
|-id=544 bgcolor=#fefefe
| 590544 ||  || — || January 1, 2008 || Kitt Peak || Spacewatch ||  || align=right data-sort-value="0.80" | 800 m || 
|-id=545 bgcolor=#fefefe
| 590545 ||  || — || February 11, 2012 || Mount Lemmon || Mount Lemmon Survey ||  || align=right data-sort-value="0.62" | 620 m || 
|-id=546 bgcolor=#fefefe
| 590546 ||  || — || January 18, 2016 || Haleakala || Pan-STARRS ||  || align=right data-sort-value="0.90" | 900 m || 
|-id=547 bgcolor=#d6d6d6
| 590547 ||  || — || October 3, 2015 || Mount Lemmon || Mount Lemmon Survey ||  || align=right | 2.5 km || 
|-id=548 bgcolor=#d6d6d6
| 590548 ||  || — || February 14, 2012 || Haleakala || Pan-STARRS ||  || align=right | 2.1 km || 
|-id=549 bgcolor=#d6d6d6
| 590549 ||  || — || February 1, 2012 || Mount Lemmon || Mount Lemmon Survey ||  || align=right | 2.7 km || 
|-id=550 bgcolor=#d6d6d6
| 590550 ||  || — || January 19, 2012 || Haleakala || Pan-STARRS ||  || align=right | 2.1 km || 
|-id=551 bgcolor=#d6d6d6
| 590551 ||  || — || February 21, 2012 || Oukaimeden || M. Ory ||  || align=right | 4.0 km || 
|-id=552 bgcolor=#fefefe
| 590552 ||  || — || February 21, 2012 || Kitt Peak || Spacewatch || H || align=right data-sort-value="0.57" | 570 m || 
|-id=553 bgcolor=#fefefe
| 590553 ||  || — || February 22, 2012 || Charleston || R. Holmes || H || align=right data-sort-value="0.50" | 500 m || 
|-id=554 bgcolor=#d6d6d6
| 590554 ||  || — || January 25, 2012 || Kitt Peak || Spacewatch ||  || align=right | 2.2 km || 
|-id=555 bgcolor=#fefefe
| 590555 ||  || — || January 20, 2012 || Haleakala || Pan-STARRS || H || align=right data-sort-value="0.45" | 450 m || 
|-id=556 bgcolor=#fefefe
| 590556 ||  || — || February 21, 2012 || Mayhill-ISON || L. Elenin ||  || align=right data-sort-value="0.77" | 770 m || 
|-id=557 bgcolor=#fefefe
| 590557 ||  || — || January 29, 2012 || Haleakala || Pan-STARRS || H || align=right data-sort-value="0.76" | 760 m || 
|-id=558 bgcolor=#fefefe
| 590558 ||  || — || September 3, 2005 || Palomar || NEAT || H || align=right data-sort-value="0.71" | 710 m || 
|-id=559 bgcolor=#d6d6d6
| 590559 ||  || — || September 24, 2009 || Mount Lemmon || Mount Lemmon Survey || 7:4 || align=right | 2.7 km || 
|-id=560 bgcolor=#fefefe
| 590560 ||  || — || February 26, 2012 || Haleakala || Pan-STARRS ||  || align=right data-sort-value="0.66" | 660 m || 
|-id=561 bgcolor=#fefefe
| 590561 ||  || — || November 19, 2003 || Kitt Peak || Spacewatch ||  || align=right data-sort-value="0.62" | 620 m || 
|-id=562 bgcolor=#fefefe
| 590562 ||  || — || February 26, 2012 || Haleakala || Pan-STARRS ||  || align=right data-sort-value="0.88" | 880 m || 
|-id=563 bgcolor=#d6d6d6
| 590563 ||  || — || March 12, 2007 || Kitt Peak || Spacewatch ||  || align=right | 1.4 km || 
|-id=564 bgcolor=#fefefe
| 590564 ||  || — || September 2, 2010 || Mount Lemmon || Mount Lemmon Survey || H || align=right data-sort-value="0.60" | 600 m || 
|-id=565 bgcolor=#fefefe
| 590565 ||  || — || February 10, 2012 || Mount Lemmon || Mount Lemmon Survey ||  || align=right data-sort-value="0.78" | 780 m || 
|-id=566 bgcolor=#d6d6d6
| 590566 ||  || — || February 27, 2012 || Haleakala || Pan-STARRS ||  || align=right | 2.6 km || 
|-id=567 bgcolor=#d6d6d6
| 590567 ||  || — || April 12, 2013 || Haleakala || Pan-STARRS ||  || align=right | 3.1 km || 
|-id=568 bgcolor=#d6d6d6
| 590568 ||  || — || February 16, 2012 || Mayhill-ISON || L. Elenin ||  || align=right | 2.9 km || 
|-id=569 bgcolor=#fefefe
| 590569 ||  || — || February 21, 2012 || Kitt Peak || Spacewatch || H || align=right data-sort-value="0.51" | 510 m || 
|-id=570 bgcolor=#d6d6d6
| 590570 ||  || — || February 16, 2012 || Haleakala || Pan-STARRS ||  || align=right | 2.3 km || 
|-id=571 bgcolor=#d6d6d6
| 590571 ||  || — || February 24, 2012 || Mount Lemmon || Mount Lemmon Survey ||  || align=right | 2.5 km || 
|-id=572 bgcolor=#d6d6d6
| 590572 ||  || — || February 19, 2012 || Kitt Peak || Spacewatch ||  || align=right | 2.5 km || 
|-id=573 bgcolor=#E9E9E9
| 590573 ||  || — || February 26, 2012 || Mount Lemmon || Mount Lemmon Survey ||  || align=right data-sort-value="0.79" | 790 m || 
|-id=574 bgcolor=#d6d6d6
| 590574 ||  || — || February 23, 2012 || Kitt Peak || Spacewatch ||  || align=right | 2.5 km || 
|-id=575 bgcolor=#d6d6d6
| 590575 ||  || — || August 16, 2009 || Kitt Peak || Spacewatch ||  || align=right | 3.2 km || 
|-id=576 bgcolor=#fefefe
| 590576 ||  || — || February 13, 2012 || Kitt Peak || Spacewatch || H || align=right data-sort-value="0.51" | 510 m || 
|-id=577 bgcolor=#fefefe
| 590577 ||  || — || October 2, 2006 || Mount Lemmon || Mount Lemmon Survey ||  || align=right data-sort-value="0.84" | 840 m || 
|-id=578 bgcolor=#fefefe
| 590578 ||  || — || March 17, 2004 || Palomar || NEAT || H || align=right data-sort-value="0.60" | 600 m || 
|-id=579 bgcolor=#d6d6d6
| 590579 ||  || — || March 15, 2012 || Piszkesteto || K. Sárneczky ||  || align=right | 3.3 km || 
|-id=580 bgcolor=#fefefe
| 590580 ||  || — || August 30, 2013 || Haleakala || Pan-STARRS ||  || align=right data-sort-value="0.75" | 750 m || 
|-id=581 bgcolor=#d6d6d6
| 590581 ||  || — || January 16, 2000 || Kitt Peak || Spacewatch ||  || align=right | 3.2 km || 
|-id=582 bgcolor=#FA8072
| 590582 ||  || — || March 16, 2012 || Catalina || CSS || H || align=right data-sort-value="0.62" | 620 m || 
|-id=583 bgcolor=#d6d6d6
| 590583 ||  || — || January 27, 2012 || Kitt Peak || Spacewatch ||  || align=right | 3.7 km || 
|-id=584 bgcolor=#d6d6d6
| 590584 ||  || — || December 3, 2010 || Mount Lemmon || Mount Lemmon Survey ||  || align=right | 1.7 km || 
|-id=585 bgcolor=#d6d6d6
| 590585 ||  || — || September 15, 2009 || Kitt Peak || Spacewatch ||  || align=right | 2.2 km || 
|-id=586 bgcolor=#d6d6d6
| 590586 ||  || — || March 17, 2012 || Mount Lemmon || Mount Lemmon Survey ||  || align=right | 2.0 km || 
|-id=587 bgcolor=#fefefe
| 590587 ||  || — || March 21, 2012 || Haleakala || Pan-STARRS || H || align=right data-sort-value="0.53" | 530 m || 
|-id=588 bgcolor=#fefefe
| 590588 ||  || — || February 10, 2008 || Kitt Peak || Spacewatch ||  || align=right data-sort-value="0.80" | 800 m || 
|-id=589 bgcolor=#E9E9E9
| 590589 ||  || — || April 9, 2008 || Mount Lemmon || Mount Lemmon Survey ||  || align=right data-sort-value="0.61" | 610 m || 
|-id=590 bgcolor=#fefefe
| 590590 ||  || — || March 25, 2012 || Mount Lemmon || Mount Lemmon Survey ||  || align=right data-sort-value="0.82" | 820 m || 
|-id=591 bgcolor=#fefefe
| 590591 ||  || — || January 10, 2008 || Mount Lemmon || Mount Lemmon Survey ||  || align=right data-sort-value="0.87" | 870 m || 
|-id=592 bgcolor=#fefefe
| 590592 ||  || — || February 26, 2012 || Kitt Peak || Spacewatch ||  || align=right data-sort-value="0.63" | 630 m || 
|-id=593 bgcolor=#E9E9E9
| 590593 ||  || — || February 28, 2012 || Haleakala || Pan-STARRS ||  || align=right data-sort-value="0.60" | 600 m || 
|-id=594 bgcolor=#E9E9E9
| 590594 ||  || — || August 29, 2005 || Kitt Peak || Spacewatch ||  || align=right data-sort-value="0.87" | 870 m || 
|-id=595 bgcolor=#E9E9E9
| 590595 ||  || — || October 23, 2001 || Palomar || NEAT ||  || align=right | 1.4 km || 
|-id=596 bgcolor=#fefefe
| 590596 ||  || — || September 27, 2003 || Kitt Peak || Spacewatch ||  || align=right data-sort-value="0.92" | 920 m || 
|-id=597 bgcolor=#fefefe
| 590597 ||  || — || February 26, 2012 || Kitt Peak || Spacewatch || H || align=right data-sort-value="0.60" | 600 m || 
|-id=598 bgcolor=#E9E9E9
| 590598 ||  || — || April 3, 2008 || Mount Lemmon || Mount Lemmon Survey ||  || align=right data-sort-value="0.71" | 710 m || 
|-id=599 bgcolor=#d6d6d6
| 590599 ||  || — || March 29, 2012 || Kitt Peak || Spacewatch ||  || align=right | 2.4 km || 
|-id=600 bgcolor=#fefefe
| 590600 ||  || — || March 17, 2012 || Kitt Peak || Spacewatch || H || align=right data-sort-value="0.59" | 590 m || 
|}

590601–590700 

|-bgcolor=#d6d6d6
| 590601 ||  || — || March 17, 2012 || Mount Lemmon || Mount Lemmon Survey ||  || align=right | 2.8 km || 
|-id=602 bgcolor=#d6d6d6
| 590602 ||  || — || March 16, 2012 || Haleakala || Pan-STARRS ||  || align=right | 2.8 km || 
|-id=603 bgcolor=#fefefe
| 590603 ||  || — || September 3, 2005 || Palomar || NEAT || H || align=right data-sort-value="0.62" | 620 m || 
|-id=604 bgcolor=#fefefe
| 590604 ||  || — || March 16, 2012 || Haleakala || Pan-STARRS || H || align=right data-sort-value="0.55" | 550 m || 
|-id=605 bgcolor=#d6d6d6
| 590605 ||  || — || March 16, 2012 || Catalina || CSS ||  || align=right | 3.5 km || 
|-id=606 bgcolor=#d6d6d6
| 590606 ||  || — || March 30, 2012 || Siding Spring || SSS ||  || align=right | 4.0 km || 
|-id=607 bgcolor=#fefefe
| 590607 ||  || — || January 17, 2004 || Palomar || NEAT ||  || align=right | 1.3 km || 
|-id=608 bgcolor=#FA8072
| 590608 ||  || — || April 25, 2012 || Haleakala || Pan-STARRS ||  || align=right data-sort-value="0.74" | 740 m || 
|-id=609 bgcolor=#E9E9E9
| 590609 ||  || — || April 27, 2012 || Kitt Peak || Spacewatch ||  || align=right data-sort-value="0.99" | 990 m || 
|-id=610 bgcolor=#fefefe
| 590610 ||  || — || April 20, 2012 || Mount Lemmon || Mount Lemmon Survey ||  || align=right data-sort-value="0.73" | 730 m || 
|-id=611 bgcolor=#fefefe
| 590611 ||  || — || May 28, 2004 || Kitt Peak || Spacewatch || H || align=right data-sort-value="0.50" | 500 m || 
|-id=612 bgcolor=#fefefe
| 590612 ||  || — || March 28, 2012 || Haleakala || Pan-STARRS || H || align=right data-sort-value="0.64" | 640 m || 
|-id=613 bgcolor=#d6d6d6
| 590613 ||  || — || October 24, 2009 || Kitt Peak || Spacewatch ||  || align=right | 2.6 km || 
|-id=614 bgcolor=#fefefe
| 590614 ||  || — || April 24, 2012 || Haleakala || Pan-STARRS || H || align=right data-sort-value="0.75" | 750 m || 
|-id=615 bgcolor=#E9E9E9
| 590615 ||  || — || April 28, 2012 || Kitt Peak || Spacewatch ||  || align=right data-sort-value="0.71" | 710 m || 
|-id=616 bgcolor=#d6d6d6
| 590616 ||  || — || March 8, 2005 || Mount Lemmon || Mount Lemmon Survey || 7:4 || align=right | 3.0 km || 
|-id=617 bgcolor=#E9E9E9
| 590617 ||  || — || April 28, 2012 || Mount Lemmon || Mount Lemmon Survey ||  || align=right data-sort-value="0.66" | 660 m || 
|-id=618 bgcolor=#d6d6d6
| 590618 ||  || — || September 10, 2015 || Haleakala || Pan-STARRS || Tj (2.99) || align=right | 3.1 km || 
|-id=619 bgcolor=#E9E9E9
| 590619 ||  || — || April 23, 2012 || Kitt Peak || Spacewatch ||  || align=right data-sort-value="0.65" | 650 m || 
|-id=620 bgcolor=#E9E9E9
| 590620 ||  || — || April 16, 2012 || Kitt Peak || Spacewatch ||  || align=right data-sort-value="0.70" | 700 m || 
|-id=621 bgcolor=#fefefe
| 590621 ||  || — || April 27, 2012 || Haleakala || Pan-STARRS ||  || align=right data-sort-value="0.81" | 810 m || 
|-id=622 bgcolor=#d6d6d6
| 590622 ||  || — || April 30, 2012 || Kitt Peak || Spacewatch ||  || align=right | 2.0 km || 
|-id=623 bgcolor=#E9E9E9
| 590623 ||  || — || April 30, 2012 || Kitt Peak || Spacewatch ||  || align=right data-sort-value="0.94" | 940 m || 
|-id=624 bgcolor=#fefefe
| 590624 ||  || — || February 20, 2004 || Bergisch Gladbach || W. Bickel ||  || align=right data-sort-value="0.98" | 980 m || 
|-id=625 bgcolor=#E9E9E9
| 590625 ||  || — || May 12, 2012 || Mount Lemmon || Mount Lemmon Survey ||  || align=right data-sort-value="0.83" | 830 m || 
|-id=626 bgcolor=#E9E9E9
| 590626 ||  || — || May 1, 2012 || Mount Lemmon || Mount Lemmon Survey ||  || align=right | 1.5 km || 
|-id=627 bgcolor=#fefefe
| 590627 ||  || — || May 29, 1998 || Kitt Peak || Spacewatch || H || align=right data-sort-value="0.64" | 640 m || 
|-id=628 bgcolor=#E9E9E9
| 590628 ||  || — || April 21, 2012 || Mount Lemmon || Mount Lemmon Survey ||  || align=right data-sort-value="0.89" | 890 m || 
|-id=629 bgcolor=#E9E9E9
| 590629 ||  || — || May 15, 2012 || Mount Lemmon || Mount Lemmon Survey ||  || align=right | 1.00 km || 
|-id=630 bgcolor=#E9E9E9
| 590630 ||  || — || May 15, 2012 || Mount Lemmon || Mount Lemmon Survey ||  || align=right data-sort-value="0.88" | 880 m || 
|-id=631 bgcolor=#E9E9E9
| 590631 ||  || — || May 15, 2012 || Haleakala || Pan-STARRS ||  || align=right data-sort-value="0.80" | 800 m || 
|-id=632 bgcolor=#E9E9E9
| 590632 ||  || — || May 14, 2012 || Haleakala || Pan-STARRS ||  || align=right data-sort-value="0.67" | 670 m || 
|-id=633 bgcolor=#E9E9E9
| 590633 ||  || — || September 27, 2009 || Kitt Peak || Spacewatch ||  || align=right data-sort-value="0.60" | 600 m || 
|-id=634 bgcolor=#E9E9E9
| 590634 ||  || — || August 4, 2008 || Crni Vrh || J. Skvarč ||  || align=right | 1.5 km || 
|-id=635 bgcolor=#E9E9E9
| 590635 ||  || — || May 16, 2012 || Haleakala || Pan-STARRS ||  || align=right data-sort-value="0.77" | 770 m || 
|-id=636 bgcolor=#fefefe
| 590636 ||  || — || January 5, 2006 || Mount Lemmon || Mount Lemmon Survey || H || align=right data-sort-value="0.78" | 780 m || 
|-id=637 bgcolor=#E9E9E9
| 590637 ||  || — || May 16, 2012 || Kitt Peak || Spacewatch ||  || align=right data-sort-value="0.83" | 830 m || 
|-id=638 bgcolor=#E9E9E9
| 590638 ||  || — || December 12, 2006 || Mount Lemmon || Mount Lemmon Survey ||  || align=right | 1.0 km || 
|-id=639 bgcolor=#E9E9E9
| 590639 ||  || — || May 19, 2012 || Charleston || R. Holmes ||  || align=right data-sort-value="0.77" | 770 m || 
|-id=640 bgcolor=#E9E9E9
| 590640 ||  || — || January 19, 2007 || Mauna Kea || Mauna Kea Obs. ||  || align=right data-sort-value="0.64" | 640 m || 
|-id=641 bgcolor=#E9E9E9
| 590641 ||  || — || May 16, 2012 || Mount Lemmon || Mount Lemmon Survey ||  || align=right data-sort-value="0.75" | 750 m || 
|-id=642 bgcolor=#E9E9E9
| 590642 ||  || — || April 30, 2008 || Kitt Peak || Spacewatch ||  || align=right data-sort-value="0.63" | 630 m || 
|-id=643 bgcolor=#fefefe
| 590643 ||  || — || July 31, 2005 || Palomar || NEAT ||  || align=right data-sort-value="0.73" | 730 m || 
|-id=644 bgcolor=#E9E9E9
| 590644 ||  || — || December 2, 2010 || Kitt Peak || Spacewatch ||  || align=right | 1.2 km || 
|-id=645 bgcolor=#E9E9E9
| 590645 ||  || — || May 18, 2012 || Mount Lemmon || Mount Lemmon Survey ||  || align=right | 1.2 km || 
|-id=646 bgcolor=#E9E9E9
| 590646 ||  || — || May 19, 2012 || Mount Lemmon || Mount Lemmon Survey ||  || align=right data-sort-value="0.92" | 920 m || 
|-id=647 bgcolor=#E9E9E9
| 590647 ||  || — || January 28, 2007 || Mount Lemmon || Mount Lemmon Survey ||  || align=right data-sort-value="0.95" | 950 m || 
|-id=648 bgcolor=#E9E9E9
| 590648 ||  || — || April 20, 2012 || Kitt Peak || Spacewatch ||  || align=right | 1.7 km || 
|-id=649 bgcolor=#E9E9E9
| 590649 ||  || — || September 27, 2008 || Mount Lemmon || Mount Lemmon Survey ||  || align=right | 1.2 km || 
|-id=650 bgcolor=#E9E9E9
| 590650 ||  || — || June 10, 2012 || Mount Lemmon || Mount Lemmon Survey ||  || align=right data-sort-value="0.83" | 830 m || 
|-id=651 bgcolor=#E9E9E9
| 590651 ||  || — || November 24, 2009 || Kitt Peak || Spacewatch ||  || align=right | 1.3 km || 
|-id=652 bgcolor=#E9E9E9
| 590652 ||  || — || March 29, 2003 || Anderson Mesa || LONEOS ||  || align=right | 1.4 km || 
|-id=653 bgcolor=#E9E9E9
| 590653 ||  || — || April 21, 2012 || Mount Lemmon || Mount Lemmon Survey ||  || align=right data-sort-value="0.90" | 900 m || 
|-id=654 bgcolor=#E9E9E9
| 590654 ||  || — || June 15, 2012 || Mount Lemmon || Mount Lemmon Survey ||  || align=right data-sort-value="0.65" | 650 m || 
|-id=655 bgcolor=#fefefe
| 590655 ||  || — || May 19, 2005 || Mount Lemmon || Mount Lemmon Survey ||  || align=right data-sort-value="0.68" | 680 m || 
|-id=656 bgcolor=#E9E9E9
| 590656 ||  || — || November 10, 2013 || Mount Lemmon || Mount Lemmon Survey ||  || align=right data-sort-value="0.87" | 870 m || 
|-id=657 bgcolor=#E9E9E9
| 590657 ||  || — || June 17, 2012 || Mount Lemmon || Mount Lemmon Survey ||  || align=right | 1.0 km || 
|-id=658 bgcolor=#E9E9E9
| 590658 ||  || — || May 16, 2012 || Haleakala || Pan-STARRS ||  || align=right data-sort-value="0.87" | 870 m || 
|-id=659 bgcolor=#E9E9E9
| 590659 ||  || — || December 19, 2001 || Palomar || NEAT ||  || align=right | 1.4 km || 
|-id=660 bgcolor=#E9E9E9
| 590660 ||  || — || May 29, 2012 || Mount Lemmon || Mount Lemmon Survey ||  || align=right data-sort-value="0.97" | 970 m || 
|-id=661 bgcolor=#E9E9E9
| 590661 ||  || — || December 9, 2010 || Mount Lemmon || Mount Lemmon Survey ||  || align=right | 1.9 km || 
|-id=662 bgcolor=#E9E9E9
| 590662 ||  || — || October 1, 2008 || Catalina || CSS ||  || align=right | 1.4 km || 
|-id=663 bgcolor=#E9E9E9
| 590663 ||  || — || June 21, 2012 || Mount Lemmon || Mount Lemmon Survey ||  || align=right | 2.6 km || 
|-id=664 bgcolor=#E9E9E9
| 590664 ||  || — || November 11, 2001 || Apache Point || SDSS Collaboration ||  || align=right | 1.1 km || 
|-id=665 bgcolor=#E9E9E9
| 590665 ||  || — || June 16, 1999 || Wise || Wise Obs. ||  || align=right | 1.5 km || 
|-id=666 bgcolor=#E9E9E9
| 590666 Jianguo ||  ||  || April 12, 2007 || Lulin || LUSS || EUN || align=right | 1.7 km || 
|-id=667 bgcolor=#E9E9E9
| 590667 ||  || — || April 12, 2016 || Haleakala || Pan-STARRS ||  || align=right | 1.4 km || 
|-id=668 bgcolor=#E9E9E9
| 590668 ||  || — || October 7, 2004 || Kitt Peak || Spacewatch ||  || align=right | 1.3 km || 
|-id=669 bgcolor=#E9E9E9
| 590669 ||  || — || July 21, 2012 || Siding Spring || SSS ||  || align=right | 1.3 km || 
|-id=670 bgcolor=#E9E9E9
| 590670 ||  || — || September 23, 2008 || Mount Lemmon || Mount Lemmon Survey ||  || align=right | 1.2 km || 
|-id=671 bgcolor=#E9E9E9
| 590671 ||  || — || December 20, 2004 || Mount Lemmon || Mount Lemmon Survey ||  || align=right | 1.7 km || 
|-id=672 bgcolor=#d6d6d6
| 590672 ||  || — || December 31, 2008 || Kitt Peak || Spacewatch ||  || align=right | 1.8 km || 
|-id=673 bgcolor=#E9E9E9
| 590673 ||  || — || May 23, 2012 || Mount Lemmon || Mount Lemmon Survey ||  || align=right | 1.9 km || 
|-id=674 bgcolor=#E9E9E9
| 590674 ||  || — || October 31, 2008 || Mount Lemmon || Mount Lemmon Survey ||  || align=right | 1.3 km || 
|-id=675 bgcolor=#E9E9E9
| 590675 ||  || — || May 21, 2003 || Haleakala || AMOS ||  || align=right | 1.7 km || 
|-id=676 bgcolor=#E9E9E9
| 590676 ||  || — || February 21, 2002 || Kitt Peak || Spacewatch ||  || align=right | 1.5 km || 
|-id=677 bgcolor=#E9E9E9
| 590677 ||  || — || September 5, 2008 || Kitt Peak || Spacewatch ||  || align=right | 1.7 km || 
|-id=678 bgcolor=#E9E9E9
| 590678 ||  || — || May 29, 2012 || Mount Lemmon || Mount Lemmon Survey ||  || align=right | 1.3 km || 
|-id=679 bgcolor=#E9E9E9
| 590679 ||  || — || August 14, 2012 || Kitt Peak || Spacewatch ||  || align=right | 1.5 km || 
|-id=680 bgcolor=#E9E9E9
| 590680 ||  || — || August 13, 2012 || Kitt Peak || Spacewatch ||  || align=right | 1.7 km || 
|-id=681 bgcolor=#E9E9E9
| 590681 ||  || — || October 15, 1999 || Kitt Peak || Spacewatch || EUN || align=right data-sort-value="0.83" | 830 m || 
|-id=682 bgcolor=#E9E9E9
| 590682 ||  || — || August 6, 2012 || Haleakala || Pan-STARRS ||  || align=right | 2.6 km || 
|-id=683 bgcolor=#E9E9E9
| 590683 ||  || — || February 16, 2007 || Bergisch Gladbach || W. Bickel ||  || align=right | 1.9 km || 
|-id=684 bgcolor=#E9E9E9
| 590684 ||  || — || August 12, 2012 || Catalina || CSS ||  || align=right | 2.6 km || 
|-id=685 bgcolor=#E9E9E9
| 590685 ||  || — || January 15, 2005 || Kitt Peak || Spacewatch ||  || align=right | 1.9 km || 
|-id=686 bgcolor=#E9E9E9
| 590686 ||  || — || August 24, 2012 || Kitt Peak || Spacewatch ||  || align=right | 1.3 km || 
|-id=687 bgcolor=#E9E9E9
| 590687 ||  || — || October 15, 1999 || Kitt Peak || Spacewatch ||  || align=right | 1.4 km || 
|-id=688 bgcolor=#E9E9E9
| 590688 ||  || — || January 13, 2005 || Kitt Peak || Spacewatch ||  || align=right | 1.3 km || 
|-id=689 bgcolor=#E9E9E9
| 590689 ||  || — || November 18, 2008 || Catalina || CSS ||  || align=right | 1.7 km || 
|-id=690 bgcolor=#E9E9E9
| 590690 ||  || — || August 19, 2012 || Siding Spring || SSS ||  || align=right | 1.9 km || 
|-id=691 bgcolor=#E9E9E9
| 590691 ||  || — || August 17, 2012 || Haleakala || Pan-STARRS ||  || align=right | 1.3 km || 
|-id=692 bgcolor=#E9E9E9
| 590692 ||  || — || April 5, 2011 || Catalina || CSS ||  || align=right | 2.1 km || 
|-id=693 bgcolor=#d6d6d6
| 590693 ||  || — || January 27, 2004 || Anderson Mesa || LONEOS ||  || align=right | 3.6 km || 
|-id=694 bgcolor=#E9E9E9
| 590694 ||  || — || August 25, 2012 || Kitt Peak || Spacewatch ||  || align=right | 1.3 km || 
|-id=695 bgcolor=#E9E9E9
| 590695 ||  || — || February 27, 2015 || Haleakala || Pan-STARRS ||  || align=right | 1.1 km || 
|-id=696 bgcolor=#E9E9E9
| 590696 ||  || — || December 27, 2013 || Mount Lemmon || Mount Lemmon Survey ||  || align=right | 1.5 km || 
|-id=697 bgcolor=#E9E9E9
| 590697 ||  || — || August 26, 2012 || Haleakala || Pan-STARRS ||  || align=right | 1.6 km || 
|-id=698 bgcolor=#E9E9E9
| 590698 ||  || — || March 22, 2015 || Haleakala || Pan-STARRS ||  || align=right data-sort-value="0.85" | 850 m || 
|-id=699 bgcolor=#E9E9E9
| 590699 ||  || — || August 17, 2012 || Haleakala || Pan-STARRS ||  || align=right | 1.2 km || 
|-id=700 bgcolor=#E9E9E9
| 590700 ||  || — || August 16, 2012 || Alder Springs || K. Levin ||  || align=right | 1.8 km || 
|}

590701–590800 

|-bgcolor=#fefefe
| 590701 ||  || — || August 26, 2012 || Kitt Peak || Spacewatch ||  || align=right data-sort-value="0.58" | 580 m || 
|-id=702 bgcolor=#E9E9E9
| 590702 ||  || — || September 8, 2012 || Bergisch Gladbach || W. Bickel ||  || align=right | 1.7 km || 
|-id=703 bgcolor=#FA8072
| 590703 ||  || — || August 23, 2012 || Crni Vrh || J. Skvarč ||  || align=right | 1.6 km || 
|-id=704 bgcolor=#E9E9E9
| 590704 ||  || — || September 11, 2012 || Alder Springs || K. Levin ||  || align=right | 1.9 km || 
|-id=705 bgcolor=#E9E9E9
| 590705 ||  || — || September 14, 2012 || Catalina || CSS ||  || align=right | 1.8 km || 
|-id=706 bgcolor=#E9E9E9
| 590706 ||  || — || September 14, 2003 || Palomar || NEAT ||  || align=right | 2.6 km || 
|-id=707 bgcolor=#E9E9E9
| 590707 ||  || — || September 11, 2012 || ASC-Kislovodsk || ASC-Kislovodsk || ADE || align=right | 2.6 km || 
|-id=708 bgcolor=#E9E9E9
| 590708 ||  || — || August 22, 2003 || Palomar || NEAT ||  || align=right | 2.2 km || 
|-id=709 bgcolor=#E9E9E9
| 590709 ||  || — || December 2, 2005 || Mauna Kea || Mauna Kea Obs. ||  || align=right | 3.1 km || 
|-id=710 bgcolor=#E9E9E9
| 590710 ||  || — || August 28, 2003 || Haleakala || AMOS ||  || align=right | 1.9 km || 
|-id=711 bgcolor=#E9E9E9
| 590711 ||  || — || August 25, 2012 || Haleakala || Pan-STARRS ||  || align=right | 1.3 km || 
|-id=712 bgcolor=#E9E9E9
| 590712 ||  || — || October 30, 2008 || Kitt Peak || Spacewatch ||  || align=right | 1.3 km || 
|-id=713 bgcolor=#E9E9E9
| 590713 ||  || — || November 19, 2008 || Mount Lemmon || Mount Lemmon Survey ||  || align=right | 1.3 km || 
|-id=714 bgcolor=#E9E9E9
| 590714 ||  || — || August 18, 2012 || Crni Vrh || J. Skvarč ||  || align=right | 1.4 km || 
|-id=715 bgcolor=#E9E9E9
| 590715 ||  || — || December 21, 2004 || Catalina || CSS || EUN || align=right | 1.4 km || 
|-id=716 bgcolor=#E9E9E9
| 590716 ||  || — || April 22, 2007 || Kitt Peak || Spacewatch ||  || align=right | 1.3 km || 
|-id=717 bgcolor=#E9E9E9
| 590717 ||  || — || July 24, 2003 || Palomar || NEAT || ADE || align=right | 2.2 km || 
|-id=718 bgcolor=#E9E9E9
| 590718 ||  || — || September 6, 2012 || Haleakala || Pan-STARRS ||  || align=right | 1.6 km || 
|-id=719 bgcolor=#E9E9E9
| 590719 ||  || — || September 23, 2003 || Palomar || NEAT || GAL || align=right | 1.3 km || 
|-id=720 bgcolor=#E9E9E9
| 590720 ||  || — || September 17, 2012 || Mount Lemmon || Mount Lemmon Survey ||  || align=right | 1.7 km || 
|-id=721 bgcolor=#E9E9E9
| 590721 ||  || — || September 22, 2003 || Palomar || NEAT || EUN || align=right | 1.9 km || 
|-id=722 bgcolor=#E9E9E9
| 590722 ||  || — || September 22, 2008 || Mount Lemmon || Mount Lemmon Survey ||  || align=right data-sort-value="0.67" | 670 m || 
|-id=723 bgcolor=#E9E9E9
| 590723 ||  || — || September 21, 2003 || Palomar || NEAT || NEM || align=right | 2.7 km || 
|-id=724 bgcolor=#E9E9E9
| 590724 ||  || — || August 10, 2012 || Kitt Peak || Spacewatch ||  || align=right | 1.4 km || 
|-id=725 bgcolor=#E9E9E9
| 590725 ||  || — || September 16, 2003 || Kitt Peak || Spacewatch ||  || align=right | 1.6 km || 
|-id=726 bgcolor=#E9E9E9
| 590726 ||  || — || September 18, 2012 || Mount Lemmon || Mount Lemmon Survey ||  || align=right | 1.2 km || 
|-id=727 bgcolor=#fefefe
| 590727 ||  || — || October 25, 2005 || Mount Lemmon || Mount Lemmon Survey ||  || align=right data-sort-value="0.53" | 530 m || 
|-id=728 bgcolor=#E9E9E9
| 590728 ||  || — || February 18, 2010 || Mount Lemmon || Mount Lemmon Survey ||  || align=right | 1.8 km || 
|-id=729 bgcolor=#E9E9E9
| 590729 ||  || — || November 1, 2008 || Mount Lemmon || Mount Lemmon Survey ||  || align=right | 1.4 km || 
|-id=730 bgcolor=#E9E9E9
| 590730 ||  || — || October 29, 2008 || Kitt Peak || Spacewatch ||  || align=right | 1.9 km || 
|-id=731 bgcolor=#E9E9E9
| 590731 ||  || — || September 25, 2012 || Mount Lemmon || Mount Lemmon Survey ||  || align=right | 1.6 km || 
|-id=732 bgcolor=#E9E9E9
| 590732 ||  || — || September 21, 2012 || Mount Lemmon || Mount Lemmon Survey ||  || align=right | 1.8 km || 
|-id=733 bgcolor=#E9E9E9
| 590733 ||  || — || September 16, 2012 || Kitt Peak || Spacewatch ||  || align=right | 1.7 km || 
|-id=734 bgcolor=#E9E9E9
| 590734 ||  || — || September 23, 2012 || Mount Lemmon || Mount Lemmon Survey ||  || align=right | 1.6 km || 
|-id=735 bgcolor=#E9E9E9
| 590735 ||  || — || September 25, 2012 || Mount Lemmon || Mount Lemmon Survey ||  || align=right | 1.8 km || 
|-id=736 bgcolor=#FA8072
| 590736 ||  || — || November 24, 2003 || Palomar || NEAT ||  || align=right data-sort-value="0.64" | 640 m || 
|-id=737 bgcolor=#E9E9E9
| 590737 ||  || — || March 23, 2001 || Cima Ekar || C. Barbieri, G. Pignata ||  || align=right | 2.8 km || 
|-id=738 bgcolor=#E9E9E9
| 590738 ||  || — || September 22, 2012 || Kitt Peak || Spacewatch ||  || align=right | 1.1 km || 
|-id=739 bgcolor=#E9E9E9
| 590739 Miloslavov ||  ||  || September 18, 2012 || Mount Lemmon SkyCe || T. Vorobjov, A. Kostin ||  || align=right | 1.6 km || 
|-id=740 bgcolor=#E9E9E9
| 590740 ||  || — || October 8, 2012 || Mount Lemmon || Mount Lemmon Survey ||  || align=right | 1.6 km || 
|-id=741 bgcolor=#E9E9E9
| 590741 ||  || — || November 19, 2003 || Kitt Peak || Spacewatch ||  || align=right | 1.6 km || 
|-id=742 bgcolor=#E9E9E9
| 590742 ||  || — || October 27, 2003 || Kitt Peak || Spacewatch ||  || align=right | 2.7 km || 
|-id=743 bgcolor=#E9E9E9
| 590743 ||  || — || October 20, 2003 || Palomar || NEAT ||  || align=right | 1.7 km || 
|-id=744 bgcolor=#E9E9E9
| 590744 ||  || — || September 26, 2003 || Apache Point || SDSS Collaboration || NEM || align=right | 2.4 km || 
|-id=745 bgcolor=#E9E9E9
| 590745 ||  || — || October 19, 2003 || Kitt Peak || Spacewatch ||  || align=right | 1.8 km || 
|-id=746 bgcolor=#E9E9E9
| 590746 ||  || — || October 8, 2012 || Haleakala || Pan-STARRS ||  || align=right | 1.2 km || 
|-id=747 bgcolor=#E9E9E9
| 590747 ||  || — || December 1, 2003 || Kitt Peak || Spacewatch ||  || align=right | 2.1 km || 
|-id=748 bgcolor=#E9E9E9
| 590748 ||  || — || January 15, 2005 || Kitt Peak || Spacewatch ||  || align=right | 1.3 km || 
|-id=749 bgcolor=#E9E9E9
| 590749 ||  || — || October 9, 2012 || Mount Lemmon || Mount Lemmon Survey ||  || align=right | 1.7 km || 
|-id=750 bgcolor=#E9E9E9
| 590750 ||  || — || March 19, 2010 || Kitt Peak || Spacewatch ||  || align=right | 1.9 km || 
|-id=751 bgcolor=#E9E9E9
| 590751 ||  || — || September 25, 2012 || Kitt Peak || Spacewatch ||  || align=right | 1.2 km || 
|-id=752 bgcolor=#E9E9E9
| 590752 ||  || — || October 5, 2012 || Haleakala || Pan-STARRS ||  || align=right | 1.8 km || 
|-id=753 bgcolor=#fefefe
| 590753 ||  || — || October 23, 2009 || Mount Lemmon || Mount Lemmon Survey ||  || align=right data-sort-value="0.42" | 420 m || 
|-id=754 bgcolor=#E9E9E9
| 590754 ||  || — || October 7, 2012 || Haleakala || Pan-STARRS ||  || align=right | 1.5 km || 
|-id=755 bgcolor=#E9E9E9
| 590755 ||  || — || October 7, 2012 || Haleakala || Pan-STARRS ||  || align=right | 1.8 km || 
|-id=756 bgcolor=#E9E9E9
| 590756 ||  || — || October 23, 2003 || Kitt Peak || Spacewatch ||  || align=right | 2.8 km || 
|-id=757 bgcolor=#E9E9E9
| 590757 ||  || — || September 17, 2012 || Kitt Peak || Spacewatch ||  || align=right | 1.7 km || 
|-id=758 bgcolor=#E9E9E9
| 590758 ||  || — || October 9, 2012 || Haleakala || Pan-STARRS ||  || align=right | 2.2 km || 
|-id=759 bgcolor=#E9E9E9
| 590759 ||  || — || February 16, 2005 || La Silla || A. Boattini ||  || align=right | 1.9 km || 
|-id=760 bgcolor=#E9E9E9
| 590760 ||  || — || September 16, 2012 || Kitt Peak || Spacewatch ||  || align=right | 1.6 km || 
|-id=761 bgcolor=#E9E9E9
| 590761 ||  || — || February 7, 2005 || Vicques || H. Lehmann || DOR || align=right | 2.5 km || 
|-id=762 bgcolor=#E9E9E9
| 590762 ||  || — || October 10, 2012 || Mount Lemmon || Mount Lemmon Survey ||  || align=right | 1.8 km || 
|-id=763 bgcolor=#E9E9E9
| 590763 ||  || — || September 22, 2003 || Palomar || NEAT ||  || align=right | 2.5 km || 
|-id=764 bgcolor=#E9E9E9
| 590764 ||  || — || October 6, 2012 || Catalina || CSS ||  || align=right | 2.4 km || 
|-id=765 bgcolor=#E9E9E9
| 590765 ||  || — || September 16, 2003 || Kitt Peak || Spacewatch ||  || align=right | 1.9 km || 
|-id=766 bgcolor=#E9E9E9
| 590766 ||  || — || September 4, 2003 || Crni Vrh || H. Mikuž || EUN || align=right | 1.1 km || 
|-id=767 bgcolor=#E9E9E9
| 590767 ||  || — || August 24, 2003 || Cerro Tololo || Cerro Tololo Obs. ||  || align=right | 2.5 km || 
|-id=768 bgcolor=#E9E9E9
| 590768 ||  || — || October 5, 2012 || Haleakala || Pan-STARRS ||  || align=right | 1.9 km || 
|-id=769 bgcolor=#E9E9E9
| 590769 ||  || — || October 29, 2008 || Kitt Peak || Spacewatch ||  || align=right | 2.2 km || 
|-id=770 bgcolor=#E9E9E9
| 590770 ||  || — || September 18, 2003 || Campo Imperatore || CINEOS ||  || align=right | 1.3 km || 
|-id=771 bgcolor=#E9E9E9
| 590771 ||  || — || October 9, 2012 || Nogales || M. Schwartz, P. R. Holvorcem ||  || align=right | 1.4 km || 
|-id=772 bgcolor=#E9E9E9
| 590772 ||  || — || October 1, 2003 || Kitt Peak || Spacewatch ||  || align=right | 1.6 km || 
|-id=773 bgcolor=#E9E9E9
| 590773 ||  || — || October 3, 2003 || Kitt Peak || Spacewatch || NEM || align=right | 2.0 km || 
|-id=774 bgcolor=#E9E9E9
| 590774 ||  || — || October 6, 2012 || Haleakala || Pan-STARRS ||  || align=right | 1.7 km || 
|-id=775 bgcolor=#E9E9E9
| 590775 ||  || — || October 8, 2012 || Haleakala || Pan-STARRS ||  || align=right | 1.8 km || 
|-id=776 bgcolor=#E9E9E9
| 590776 ||  || — || September 13, 2007 || Mount Lemmon || Mount Lemmon Survey || AST || align=right | 1.3 km || 
|-id=777 bgcolor=#d6d6d6
| 590777 ||  || — || September 13, 2007 || Mount Lemmon || Mount Lemmon Survey ||  || align=right | 2.0 km || 
|-id=778 bgcolor=#E9E9E9
| 590778 ||  || — || October 20, 2003 || Kitt Peak || Spacewatch || NEM || align=right | 2.2 km || 
|-id=779 bgcolor=#E9E9E9
| 590779 ||  || — || October 8, 2012 || Haleakala || Pan-STARRS ||  || align=right | 1.7 km || 
|-id=780 bgcolor=#E9E9E9
| 590780 ||  || — || October 9, 2012 || Haleakala || Pan-STARRS ||  || align=right | 1.6 km || 
|-id=781 bgcolor=#E9E9E9
| 590781 ||  || — || October 9, 2012 || Haleakala || Pan-STARRS ||  || align=right | 1.6 km || 
|-id=782 bgcolor=#E9E9E9
| 590782 ||  || — || October 9, 2012 || Haleakala || Pan-STARRS ||  || align=right | 1.9 km || 
|-id=783 bgcolor=#E9E9E9
| 590783 ||  || — || March 24, 2006 || Mount Lemmon || Mount Lemmon Survey ||  || align=right | 1.9 km || 
|-id=784 bgcolor=#E9E9E9
| 590784 ||  || — || March 4, 2006 || Mount Lemmon || Mount Lemmon Survey ||  || align=right data-sort-value="0.92" | 920 m || 
|-id=785 bgcolor=#E9E9E9
| 590785 ||  || — || October 10, 2012 || Mount Lemmon || Mount Lemmon Survey ||  || align=right | 2.1 km || 
|-id=786 bgcolor=#E9E9E9
| 590786 ||  || — || August 28, 2012 || Mount Lemmon || Mount Lemmon Survey ||  || align=right | 1.8 km || 
|-id=787 bgcolor=#E9E9E9
| 590787 ||  || — || December 4, 2008 || Mount Lemmon || Mount Lemmon Survey ||  || align=right | 2.3 km || 
|-id=788 bgcolor=#E9E9E9
| 590788 ||  || — || October 11, 2012 || Mount Lemmon || Mount Lemmon Survey ||  || align=right | 1.5 km || 
|-id=789 bgcolor=#E9E9E9
| 590789 ||  || — || October 11, 2012 || Mount Lemmon || Mount Lemmon Survey ||  || align=right | 1.4 km || 
|-id=790 bgcolor=#E9E9E9
| 590790 ||  || — || October 11, 2012 || Mount Lemmon || Mount Lemmon Survey ||  || align=right | 1.6 km || 
|-id=791 bgcolor=#E9E9E9
| 590791 ||  || — || October 11, 2012 || Haleakala || Pan-STARRS ||  || align=right | 1.2 km || 
|-id=792 bgcolor=#C2FFFF
| 590792 ||  || — || March 2, 2006 || Kitt Peak || Spacewatch || L5 || align=right | 7.4 km || 
|-id=793 bgcolor=#E9E9E9
| 590793 ||  || — || October 14, 2012 || Mayhill-ISON || L. Elenin ||  || align=right | 1.8 km || 
|-id=794 bgcolor=#E9E9E9
| 590794 ||  || — || November 22, 2008 || Mount Lemmon || Mount Lemmon Survey ||  || align=right | 1.5 km || 
|-id=795 bgcolor=#E9E9E9
| 590795 ||  || — || October 6, 2012 || Haleakala || Pan-STARRS ||  || align=right | 2.5 km || 
|-id=796 bgcolor=#E9E9E9
| 590796 ||  || — || August 9, 2007 || Kitt Peak || Spacewatch ||  || align=right | 1.9 km || 
|-id=797 bgcolor=#E9E9E9
| 590797 ||  || — || October 8, 2012 || Mount Lemmon || Mount Lemmon Survey ||  || align=right | 1.5 km || 
|-id=798 bgcolor=#E9E9E9
| 590798 ||  || — || October 8, 2008 || Kitt Peak || Spacewatch ||  || align=right data-sort-value="0.75" | 750 m || 
|-id=799 bgcolor=#E9E9E9
| 590799 ||  || — || October 11, 2012 || Kitt Peak || Spacewatch ||  || align=right | 2.1 km || 
|-id=800 bgcolor=#E9E9E9
| 590800 ||  || — || October 11, 2012 || Haleakala || Pan-STARRS ||  || align=right | 2.1 km || 
|}

590801–590900 

|-bgcolor=#E9E9E9
| 590801 ||  || — || September 18, 2012 || Mount Lemmon || Mount Lemmon Survey ||  || align=right | 1.7 km || 
|-id=802 bgcolor=#E9E9E9
| 590802 ||  || — || September 20, 2003 || Kitt Peak || Spacewatch ||  || align=right | 1.9 km || 
|-id=803 bgcolor=#E9E9E9
| 590803 ||  || — || October 7, 2012 || Haleakala || Pan-STARRS ||  || align=right | 1.5 km || 
|-id=804 bgcolor=#E9E9E9
| 590804 ||  || — || September 25, 2008 || Kitt Peak || Spacewatch ||  || align=right | 2.2 km || 
|-id=805 bgcolor=#E9E9E9
| 590805 ||  || — || October 11, 2012 || Mount Lemmon || Mount Lemmon Survey ||  || align=right | 2.1 km || 
|-id=806 bgcolor=#E9E9E9
| 590806 ||  || — || October 11, 2012 || Mount Lemmon || Mount Lemmon Survey ||  || align=right | 1.6 km || 
|-id=807 bgcolor=#E9E9E9
| 590807 ||  || — || June 6, 2011 || Haleakala || Pan-STARRS ||  || align=right | 2.2 km || 
|-id=808 bgcolor=#E9E9E9
| 590808 ||  || — || September 18, 2003 || Kitt Peak || Spacewatch ||  || align=right | 1.4 km || 
|-id=809 bgcolor=#E9E9E9
| 590809 ||  || — || August 23, 2003 || Palomar || NEAT ||  || align=right | 1.8 km || 
|-id=810 bgcolor=#E9E9E9
| 590810 ||  || — || March 8, 2005 || Mount Lemmon || Mount Lemmon Survey ||  || align=right | 1.7 km || 
|-id=811 bgcolor=#C2FFFF
| 590811 ||  || — || October 15, 2012 || Kitt Peak || Spacewatch || L4 || align=right | 13 km || 
|-id=812 bgcolor=#E9E9E9
| 590812 ||  || — || December 3, 2008 || Mount Lemmon || Mount Lemmon Survey ||  || align=right | 1.4 km || 
|-id=813 bgcolor=#E9E9E9
| 590813 ||  || — || October 10, 2012 || Nogales || M. Schwartz, P. R. Holvorcem ||  || align=right | 1.4 km || 
|-id=814 bgcolor=#E9E9E9
| 590814 ||  || — || October 3, 2003 || Kitt Peak || Spacewatch ||  || align=right | 3.3 km || 
|-id=815 bgcolor=#E9E9E9
| 590815 ||  || — || October 14, 2012 || Nogales || M. Schwartz, P. R. Holvorcem ||  || align=right | 1.9 km || 
|-id=816 bgcolor=#E9E9E9
| 590816 ||  || — || September 20, 2012 || Mayhill-ISON || L. Elenin ||  || align=right | 1.6 km || 
|-id=817 bgcolor=#E9E9E9
| 590817 ||  || — || September 18, 2003 || Haleakala || AMOS ||  || align=right | 2.9 km || 
|-id=818 bgcolor=#E9E9E9
| 590818 ||  || — || October 8, 2012 || Haleakala || Pan-STARRS ||  || align=right | 1.7 km || 
|-id=819 bgcolor=#E9E9E9
| 590819 ||  || — || October 11, 2012 || Haleakala || Pan-STARRS ||  || align=right | 1.9 km || 
|-id=820 bgcolor=#E9E9E9
| 590820 ||  || — || October 6, 2012 || Catalina || CSS ||  || align=right | 1.3 km || 
|-id=821 bgcolor=#d6d6d6
| 590821 ||  || — || April 16, 2015 || Haleakala || Pan-STARRS ||  || align=right | 2.4 km || 
|-id=822 bgcolor=#E9E9E9
| 590822 ||  || — || February 20, 2014 || Mount Lemmon || Mount Lemmon Survey ||  || align=right | 1.4 km || 
|-id=823 bgcolor=#d6d6d6
| 590823 ||  || — || March 21, 2015 || Haleakala || Pan-STARRS ||  || align=right | 1.7 km || 
|-id=824 bgcolor=#E9E9E9
| 590824 ||  || — || September 17, 2003 || Kitt Peak || Spacewatch ||  || align=right | 1.0 km || 
|-id=825 bgcolor=#E9E9E9
| 590825 ||  || — || October 6, 2012 || Haleakala || Pan-STARRS ||  || align=right | 1.3 km || 
|-id=826 bgcolor=#E9E9E9
| 590826 ||  || — || October 9, 2012 || Haleakala || Pan-STARRS ||  || align=right | 1.6 km || 
|-id=827 bgcolor=#d6d6d6
| 590827 ||  || — || October 11, 2012 || Haleakala || Pan-STARRS ||  || align=right | 1.5 km || 
|-id=828 bgcolor=#E9E9E9
| 590828 ||  || — || October 9, 2012 || Mount Lemmon || Mount Lemmon Survey ||  || align=right | 1.4 km || 
|-id=829 bgcolor=#E9E9E9
| 590829 ||  || — || October 14, 2012 || Mount Lemmon || Mount Lemmon Survey ||  || align=right | 1.6 km || 
|-id=830 bgcolor=#d6d6d6
| 590830 ||  || — || October 8, 2012 || Haleakala || Pan-STARRS ||  || align=right | 1.7 km || 
|-id=831 bgcolor=#E9E9E9
| 590831 ||  || — || January 16, 2005 || Kitt Peak || Spacewatch ||  || align=right | 1.3 km || 
|-id=832 bgcolor=#E9E9E9
| 590832 ||  || — || October 7, 2008 || Mount Lemmon || Mount Lemmon Survey ||  || align=right data-sort-value="0.79" | 790 m || 
|-id=833 bgcolor=#E9E9E9
| 590833 ||  || — || October 16, 2012 || Mount Lemmon || Mount Lemmon Survey ||  || align=right | 1.6 km || 
|-id=834 bgcolor=#E9E9E9
| 590834 ||  || — || March 18, 2010 || Kitt Peak || Spacewatch ||  || align=right | 1.9 km || 
|-id=835 bgcolor=#E9E9E9
| 590835 ||  || — || September 16, 2003 || Kitt Peak || Spacewatch ||  || align=right | 2.1 km || 
|-id=836 bgcolor=#E9E9E9
| 590836 ||  || — || October 16, 2012 || Mount Lemmon || Mount Lemmon Survey ||  || align=right | 1.6 km || 
|-id=837 bgcolor=#E9E9E9
| 590837 ||  || — || October 17, 2012 || Mount Lemmon || Mount Lemmon Survey ||  || align=right | 2.0 km || 
|-id=838 bgcolor=#E9E9E9
| 590838 ||  || — || October 17, 2012 || Mount Lemmon || Mount Lemmon Survey ||  || align=right | 2.0 km || 
|-id=839 bgcolor=#E9E9E9
| 590839 ||  || — || March 11, 2005 || Kitt Peak || Spacewatch || HOF || align=right | 2.7 km || 
|-id=840 bgcolor=#E9E9E9
| 590840 ||  || — || January 7, 2000 || Kitt Peak || Spacewatch ||  || align=right | 2.0 km || 
|-id=841 bgcolor=#E9E9E9
| 590841 ||  || — || September 25, 2003 || Palomar || NEAT ||  || align=right | 2.0 km || 
|-id=842 bgcolor=#d6d6d6
| 590842 ||  || — || October 6, 2012 || Kitt Peak || Spacewatch ||  || align=right | 2.5 km || 
|-id=843 bgcolor=#E9E9E9
| 590843 ||  || — || September 13, 2007 || Mount Lemmon || Mount Lemmon Survey ||  || align=right | 1.7 km || 
|-id=844 bgcolor=#E9E9E9
| 590844 ||  || — || October 5, 2012 || Piszkesteto || G. Dálya ||  || align=right | 2.2 km || 
|-id=845 bgcolor=#E9E9E9
| 590845 ||  || — || March 10, 2005 || Mount Lemmon || Mount Lemmon Survey || AGN || align=right data-sort-value="0.95" | 950 m || 
|-id=846 bgcolor=#E9E9E9
| 590846 ||  || — || October 18, 2003 || Saint-Sulpice || B. Christophe || NEM || align=right | 2.0 km || 
|-id=847 bgcolor=#E9E9E9
| 590847 ||  || — || October 20, 2012 || Kitt Peak || Spacewatch ||  || align=right | 1.1 km || 
|-id=848 bgcolor=#E9E9E9
| 590848 ||  || — || August 2, 2011 || Haleakala || Pan-STARRS ||  || align=right | 1.8 km || 
|-id=849 bgcolor=#d6d6d6
| 590849 ||  || — || November 5, 2007 || Kitt Peak || Spacewatch ||  || align=right | 1.9 km || 
|-id=850 bgcolor=#E9E9E9
| 590850 ||  || — || January 3, 2009 || Kitt Peak || Spacewatch ||  || align=right | 1.7 km || 
|-id=851 bgcolor=#E9E9E9
| 590851 ||  || — || November 22, 2003 || Kitt Peak || Kitt Peak Obs. ||  || align=right | 2.3 km || 
|-id=852 bgcolor=#d6d6d6
| 590852 ||  || — || October 18, 2012 || Haleakala || Pan-STARRS ||  || align=right | 1.6 km || 
|-id=853 bgcolor=#fefefe
| 590853 ||  || — || August 21, 2008 || Kitt Peak || Spacewatch || MAS || align=right data-sort-value="0.64" | 640 m || 
|-id=854 bgcolor=#fefefe
| 590854 ||  || — || November 18, 2006 || Kitt Peak || Spacewatch ||  || align=right data-sort-value="0.57" | 570 m || 
|-id=855 bgcolor=#d6d6d6
| 590855 ||  || — || May 11, 2010 || Mount Lemmon || Mount Lemmon Survey ||  || align=right | 2.6 km || 
|-id=856 bgcolor=#E9E9E9
| 590856 ||  || — || September 19, 2012 || Mount Lemmon || Mount Lemmon Survey ||  || align=right | 1.5 km || 
|-id=857 bgcolor=#E9E9E9
| 590857 ||  || — || October 21, 2012 || Haleakala || Pan-STARRS ||  || align=right | 1.8 km || 
|-id=858 bgcolor=#d6d6d6
| 590858 ||  || — || October 15, 2012 || Kitt Peak || Spacewatch ||  || align=right | 2.4 km || 
|-id=859 bgcolor=#d6d6d6
| 590859 ||  || — || October 21, 2007 || Mount Lemmon || Mount Lemmon Survey ||  || align=right | 2.1 km || 
|-id=860 bgcolor=#E9E9E9
| 590860 ||  || — || September 29, 2003 || Anderson Mesa || LONEOS ||  || align=right | 1.7 km || 
|-id=861 bgcolor=#E9E9E9
| 590861 ||  || — || October 9, 2012 || Catalina || CSS ||  || align=right | 2.0 km || 
|-id=862 bgcolor=#E9E9E9
| 590862 ||  || — || May 7, 2011 || Mount Lemmon || Mount Lemmon Survey ||  || align=right | 2.1 km || 
|-id=863 bgcolor=#E9E9E9
| 590863 ||  || — || October 18, 2012 || Haleakala || Pan-STARRS ||  || align=right | 2.0 km || 
|-id=864 bgcolor=#d6d6d6
| 590864 ||  || — || October 9, 2012 || Kitt Peak || Spacewatch ||  || align=right | 2.6 km || 
|-id=865 bgcolor=#E9E9E9
| 590865 ||  || — || August 20, 2003 || Haleakala || AMOS ||  || align=right | 2.2 km || 
|-id=866 bgcolor=#E9E9E9
| 590866 ||  || — || October 19, 2003 || Kitt Peak || Spacewatch ||  || align=right | 2.1 km || 
|-id=867 bgcolor=#E9E9E9
| 590867 ||  || — || January 19, 2005 || Kitt Peak || Spacewatch || PAD || align=right | 2.1 km || 
|-id=868 bgcolor=#fefefe
| 590868 ||  || — || October 22, 2012 || Kitt Peak || Spacewatch ||  || align=right data-sort-value="0.44" | 440 m || 
|-id=869 bgcolor=#d6d6d6
| 590869 ||  || — || February 18, 2010 || Mount Lemmon || Mount Lemmon Survey ||  || align=right | 1.6 km || 
|-id=870 bgcolor=#E9E9E9
| 590870 ||  || — || August 1, 2016 || Haleakala || Pan-STARRS ||  || align=right | 1.6 km || 
|-id=871 bgcolor=#d6d6d6
| 590871 ||  || — || October 17, 2012 || Mount Lemmon || Mount Lemmon Survey ||  || align=right | 2.1 km || 
|-id=872 bgcolor=#FA8072
| 590872 ||  || — || November 23, 1995 || Kitt Peak || Spacewatch ||  || align=right data-sort-value="0.77" | 770 m || 
|-id=873 bgcolor=#E9E9E9
| 590873 ||  || — || October 20, 2012 || Haleakala || Pan-STARRS ||  || align=right | 1.5 km || 
|-id=874 bgcolor=#E9E9E9
| 590874 ||  || — || October 17, 2012 || Haleakala || Pan-STARRS ||  || align=right | 1.9 km || 
|-id=875 bgcolor=#E9E9E9
| 590875 ||  || — || November 21, 2003 || Kitt Peak || Spacewatch ||  || align=right | 1.9 km || 
|-id=876 bgcolor=#E9E9E9
| 590876 ||  || — || October 25, 2012 || Kitt Peak || Spacewatch ||  || align=right | 1.6 km || 
|-id=877 bgcolor=#E9E9E9
| 590877 ||  || — || October 9, 2012 || Mount Lemmon || Mount Lemmon Survey ||  || align=right | 2.0 km || 
|-id=878 bgcolor=#E9E9E9
| 590878 ||  || — || November 19, 2003 || Kitt Peak || Spacewatch ||  || align=right | 2.4 km || 
|-id=879 bgcolor=#E9E9E9
| 590879 ||  || — || November 4, 2012 || Mount Lemmon || Mount Lemmon Survey ||  || align=right | 1.7 km || 
|-id=880 bgcolor=#d6d6d6
| 590880 ||  || — || November 19, 2007 || Kitt Peak || Spacewatch ||  || align=right | 2.5 km || 
|-id=881 bgcolor=#E9E9E9
| 590881 ||  || — || February 14, 2005 || Kitt Peak || Spacewatch ||  || align=right | 1.1 km || 
|-id=882 bgcolor=#E9E9E9
| 590882 ||  || — || November 6, 2008 || Mount Lemmon || Mount Lemmon Survey ||  || align=right | 2.3 km || 
|-id=883 bgcolor=#fefefe
| 590883 ||  || — || November 6, 2012 || Haleakala || Pan-STARRS ||  || align=right data-sort-value="0.47" | 470 m || 
|-id=884 bgcolor=#E9E9E9
| 590884 ||  || — || February 4, 2005 || Kitt Peak || Spacewatch ||  || align=right | 2.4 km || 
|-id=885 bgcolor=#E9E9E9
| 590885 ||  || — || October 23, 2003 || Kitt Peak || L. H. Wasserman, D. E. Trilling ||  || align=right | 1.9 km || 
|-id=886 bgcolor=#E9E9E9
| 590886 ||  || — || October 15, 1999 || Kitt Peak || Spacewatch ||  || align=right | 1.2 km || 
|-id=887 bgcolor=#E9E9E9
| 590887 ||  || — || July 8, 2003 || Palomar || NEAT || BRG || align=right | 2.1 km || 
|-id=888 bgcolor=#E9E9E9
| 590888 Chengda ||  ||  || July 22, 2007 || Lulin || H.-C. Lin, Q.-z. Ye || MRX || align=right | 1.2 km || 
|-id=889 bgcolor=#d6d6d6
| 590889 ||  || — || November 7, 2012 || Haleakala || Pan-STARRS ||  || align=right | 1.8 km || 
|-id=890 bgcolor=#E9E9E9
| 590890 ||  || — || November 7, 2012 || Haleakala || Pan-STARRS ||  || align=right | 1.9 km || 
|-id=891 bgcolor=#E9E9E9
| 590891 ||  || — || September 10, 2007 || Kitt Peak || Spacewatch ||  || align=right | 1.5 km || 
|-id=892 bgcolor=#E9E9E9
| 590892 ||  || — || September 14, 2007 || Kitt Peak || Spacewatch ||  || align=right | 1.7 km || 
|-id=893 bgcolor=#E9E9E9
| 590893 ||  || — || November 7, 2012 || Haleakala || Pan-STARRS ||  || align=right | 2.1 km || 
|-id=894 bgcolor=#E9E9E9
| 590894 ||  || — || August 14, 2002 || Palomar || NEAT ||  || align=right | 2.6 km || 
|-id=895 bgcolor=#E9E9E9
| 590895 ||  || — || November 12, 2012 || Bergisch Gladbach || W. Bickel ||  || align=right | 2.3 km || 
|-id=896 bgcolor=#fefefe
| 590896 ||  || — || October 21, 2012 || Haleakala || Pan-STARRS ||  || align=right data-sort-value="0.43" | 430 m || 
|-id=897 bgcolor=#E9E9E9
| 590897 ||  || — || September 10, 2007 || Kitt Peak || Spacewatch ||  || align=right | 1.8 km || 
|-id=898 bgcolor=#E9E9E9
| 590898 ||  || — || December 3, 2008 || Mount Lemmon || Mount Lemmon Survey ||  || align=right | 2.4 km || 
|-id=899 bgcolor=#E9E9E9
| 590899 ||  || — || April 7, 2002 || Cerro Tololo || Cerro Tololo Obs. ||  || align=right | 2.0 km || 
|-id=900 bgcolor=#d6d6d6
| 590900 ||  || — || October 17, 2007 || Mount Lemmon || Mount Lemmon Survey ||  || align=right | 1.9 km || 
|}

590901–591000 

|-bgcolor=#E9E9E9
| 590901 ||  || — || November 18, 2008 || Kitt Peak || Spacewatch ||  || align=right data-sort-value="0.57" | 570 m || 
|-id=902 bgcolor=#E9E9E9
| 590902 ||  || — || May 7, 2006 || Mount Lemmon || Mount Lemmon Survey ||  || align=right | 1.9 km || 
|-id=903 bgcolor=#E9E9E9
| 590903 ||  || — || August 9, 2016 || Haleakala || Pan-STARRS ||  || align=right | 1.8 km || 
|-id=904 bgcolor=#E9E9E9
| 590904 ||  || — || November 12, 2012 || Mount Lemmon || Mount Lemmon Survey ||  || align=right | 1.8 km || 
|-id=905 bgcolor=#E9E9E9
| 590905 ||  || — || February 4, 2009 || Mount Lemmon || Mount Lemmon Survey ||  || align=right | 1.7 km || 
|-id=906 bgcolor=#E9E9E9
| 590906 ||  || — || April 11, 2010 || Mount Lemmon || Mount Lemmon Survey ||  || align=right data-sort-value="0.89" | 890 m || 
|-id=907 bgcolor=#E9E9E9
| 590907 ||  || — || November 29, 2003 || Kitt Peak || Spacewatch ||  || align=right | 1.7 km || 
|-id=908 bgcolor=#E9E9E9
| 590908 ||  || — || November 26, 2012 || Mount Lemmon || Mount Lemmon Survey ||  || align=right | 2.2 km || 
|-id=909 bgcolor=#fefefe
| 590909 ||  || — || December 4, 2012 || Mount Lemmon || Mount Lemmon Survey ||  || align=right data-sort-value="0.96" | 960 m || 
|-id=910 bgcolor=#E9E9E9
| 590910 ||  || — || October 25, 2012 || Kitt Peak || Spacewatch ||  || align=right | 2.2 km || 
|-id=911 bgcolor=#E9E9E9
| 590911 ||  || — || October 15, 2012 || Kitt Peak || Spacewatch ||  || align=right | 2.2 km || 
|-id=912 bgcolor=#d6d6d6
| 590912 ||  || — || October 25, 2001 || Apache Point || SDSS Collaboration ||  || align=right | 2.5 km || 
|-id=913 bgcolor=#d6d6d6
| 590913 ||  || — || November 4, 2007 || Mount Lemmon || Mount Lemmon Survey ||  || align=right | 2.2 km || 
|-id=914 bgcolor=#d6d6d6
| 590914 ||  || — || October 22, 2012 || Haleakala || Pan-STARRS ||  || align=right | 2.0 km || 
|-id=915 bgcolor=#fefefe
| 590915 ||  || — || January 6, 2010 || Kitt Peak || Spacewatch ||  || align=right data-sort-value="0.60" | 600 m || 
|-id=916 bgcolor=#E9E9E9
| 590916 ||  || — || December 3, 2012 || Mount Lemmon || Mount Lemmon Survey ||  || align=right | 2.1 km || 
|-id=917 bgcolor=#E9E9E9
| 590917 ||  || — || November 12, 2012 || Mount Lemmon || Mount Lemmon Survey ||  || align=right | 2.0 km || 
|-id=918 bgcolor=#fefefe
| 590918 ||  || — || December 3, 2012 || Mount Lemmon || Mount Lemmon Survey ||  || align=right data-sort-value="0.54" | 540 m || 
|-id=919 bgcolor=#fefefe
| 590919 ||  || — || December 3, 2012 || Mount Lemmon || Mount Lemmon Survey ||  || align=right data-sort-value="0.47" | 470 m || 
|-id=920 bgcolor=#E9E9E9
| 590920 ||  || — || October 8, 2012 || Mount Lemmon || Mount Lemmon Survey ||  || align=right | 1.3 km || 
|-id=921 bgcolor=#d6d6d6
| 590921 ||  || — || November 12, 2012 || Mount Lemmon || Mount Lemmon Survey ||  || align=right | 1.7 km || 
|-id=922 bgcolor=#d6d6d6
| 590922 ||  || — || December 6, 2012 || Mount Lemmon || Mount Lemmon Survey ||  || align=right | 2.1 km || 
|-id=923 bgcolor=#E9E9E9
| 590923 ||  || — || December 6, 2012 || Mount Lemmon || Mount Lemmon Survey ||  || align=right data-sort-value="0.73" | 730 m || 
|-id=924 bgcolor=#fefefe
| 590924 ||  || — || October 21, 2008 || Mount Lemmon || Mount Lemmon Survey ||  || align=right data-sort-value="0.69" | 690 m || 
|-id=925 bgcolor=#E9E9E9
| 590925 ||  || — || December 4, 2012 || Kitt Peak || Spacewatch ||  || align=right | 2.1 km || 
|-id=926 bgcolor=#E9E9E9
| 590926 ||  || — || November 13, 2012 || Kitt Peak || Spacewatch || GEF || align=right data-sort-value="0.97" | 970 m || 
|-id=927 bgcolor=#E9E9E9
| 590927 ||  || — || October 5, 2012 || Kitt Peak || Spacewatch ||  || align=right | 2.2 km || 
|-id=928 bgcolor=#d6d6d6
| 590928 ||  || — || December 9, 2012 || Haleakala || Pan-STARRS ||  || align=right | 2.9 km || 
|-id=929 bgcolor=#E9E9E9
| 590929 ||  || — || September 10, 2007 || Kitt Peak || Spacewatch ||  || align=right | 2.4 km || 
|-id=930 bgcolor=#d6d6d6
| 590930 ||  || — || September 14, 2007 || Mount Lemmon || Mount Lemmon Survey ||  || align=right | 2.0 km || 
|-id=931 bgcolor=#E9E9E9
| 590931 ||  || — || December 8, 2012 || Mount Lemmon || Mount Lemmon Survey ||  || align=right | 2.0 km || 
|-id=932 bgcolor=#E9E9E9
| 590932 ||  || — || November 6, 2012 || Kitt Peak || Spacewatch ||  || align=right | 1.8 km || 
|-id=933 bgcolor=#d6d6d6
| 590933 ||  || — || September 21, 2011 || Mount Lemmon || Mount Lemmon Survey ||  || align=right | 2.2 km || 
|-id=934 bgcolor=#E9E9E9
| 590934 ||  || — || September 13, 2007 || Catalina || CSS ||  || align=right | 1.8 km || 
|-id=935 bgcolor=#d6d6d6
| 590935 ||  || — || February 11, 2004 || Kitt Peak || Spacewatch ||  || align=right | 3.3 km || 
|-id=936 bgcolor=#E9E9E9
| 590936 ||  || — || December 12, 2012 || Mount Lemmon || Mount Lemmon Survey ||  || align=right | 1.9 km || 
|-id=937 bgcolor=#E9E9E9
| 590937 ||  || — || August 12, 2015 || Haleakala || Pan-STARRS ||  || align=right | 2.1 km || 
|-id=938 bgcolor=#d6d6d6
| 590938 ||  || — || December 12, 2012 || Mount Lemmon || Mount Lemmon Survey ||  || align=right | 2.3 km || 
|-id=939 bgcolor=#d6d6d6
| 590939 ||  || — || December 9, 2012 || Mount Lemmon || Mount Lemmon Survey ||  || align=right | 2.5 km || 
|-id=940 bgcolor=#fefefe
| 590940 ||  || — || December 8, 2012 || Kitt Peak || Spacewatch ||  || align=right data-sort-value="0.51" | 510 m || 
|-id=941 bgcolor=#d6d6d6
| 590941 ||  || — || December 11, 2012 || Mount Lemmon || Mount Lemmon Survey ||  || align=right | 2.7 km || 
|-id=942 bgcolor=#C2FFFF
| 590942 ||  || — || November 25, 2011 || Haleakala || Pan-STARRS || L4 || align=right | 9.1 km || 
|-id=943 bgcolor=#E9E9E9
| 590943 ||  || — || November 19, 2003 || Palomar || NEAT ||  || align=right | 2.1 km || 
|-id=944 bgcolor=#C2FFFF
| 590944 ||  || — || January 10, 2014 || Mount Lemmon || Mount Lemmon Survey || L4 || align=right | 7.7 km || 
|-id=945 bgcolor=#d6d6d6
| 590945 ||  || — || December 23, 2012 || Haleakala || Pan-STARRS ||  || align=right | 2.7 km || 
|-id=946 bgcolor=#d6d6d6
| 590946 ||  || — || December 23, 2012 || Haleakala || Pan-STARRS ||  || align=right | 1.9 km || 
|-id=947 bgcolor=#d6d6d6
| 590947 ||  || — || December 22, 2012 || Haleakala || Pan-STARRS ||  || align=right | 2.4 km || 
|-id=948 bgcolor=#d6d6d6
| 590948 ||  || — || January 3, 2013 || Catalina || CSS ||  || align=right | 2.1 km || 
|-id=949 bgcolor=#d6d6d6
| 590949 ||  || — || January 6, 2013 || Mount Lemmon || Mount Lemmon Survey ||  || align=right | 2.4 km || 
|-id=950 bgcolor=#d6d6d6
| 590950 ||  || — || September 27, 2011 || Mount Lemmon || Mount Lemmon Survey ||  || align=right | 3.3 km || 
|-id=951 bgcolor=#d6d6d6
| 590951 ||  || — || December 4, 2007 || Mount Lemmon || Mount Lemmon Survey ||  || align=right | 2.3 km || 
|-id=952 bgcolor=#C2FFFF
| 590952 ||  || — || November 25, 2011 || Haleakala || Pan-STARRS || L4 || align=right | 8.7 km || 
|-id=953 bgcolor=#d6d6d6
| 590953 ||  || — || January 7, 2013 || Haleakala || Pan-STARRS ||  || align=right | 2.6 km || 
|-id=954 bgcolor=#d6d6d6
| 590954 ||  || — || January 6, 2013 || Kitt Peak || Spacewatch ||  || align=right | 2.8 km || 
|-id=955 bgcolor=#d6d6d6
| 590955 ||  || — || February 14, 2002 || Kitt Peak || Spacewatch ||  || align=right | 2.5 km || 
|-id=956 bgcolor=#d6d6d6
| 590956 ||  || — || January 10, 2013 || Kitt Peak || Spacewatch ||  || align=right | 2.2 km || 
|-id=957 bgcolor=#fefefe
| 590957 ||  || — || December 11, 2012 || Kitt Peak || Spacewatch ||  || align=right data-sort-value="0.60" | 600 m || 
|-id=958 bgcolor=#C2FFFF
| 590958 ||  || — || January 14, 2013 || ESA OGS || ESA OGS || L4 || align=right | 9.8 km || 
|-id=959 bgcolor=#C2FFFF
| 590959 ||  || — || December 13, 2010 || Mount Lemmon || Mount Lemmon Survey || L4 || align=right | 7.0 km || 
|-id=960 bgcolor=#d6d6d6
| 590960 ||  || — || January 15, 2013 || Charleston || R. Holmes ||  || align=right | 2.1 km || 
|-id=961 bgcolor=#d6d6d6
| 590961 ||  || — || July 6, 2005 || Kitt Peak || Spacewatch || EOS || align=right | 2.2 km || 
|-id=962 bgcolor=#E9E9E9
| 590962 ||  || — || February 11, 2004 || Kitt Peak || Spacewatch ||  || align=right | 2.2 km || 
|-id=963 bgcolor=#C2FFFF
| 590963 ||  || — || February 17, 2001 || Haleakala || AMOS || L4 || align=right | 12 km || 
|-id=964 bgcolor=#E9E9E9
| 590964 ||  || — || December 8, 2012 || Kitt Peak || Spacewatch ||  || align=right | 1.5 km || 
|-id=965 bgcolor=#E9E9E9
| 590965 ||  || — || January 5, 2013 || Mount Lemmon || Mount Lemmon Survey ||  || align=right | 2.0 km || 
|-id=966 bgcolor=#d6d6d6
| 590966 ||  || — || January 6, 2013 || Mount Lemmon || Mount Lemmon Survey ||  || align=right | 3.3 km || 
|-id=967 bgcolor=#d6d6d6
| 590967 ||  || — || January 4, 2013 || Kitt Peak || Spacewatch ||  || align=right | 3.3 km || 
|-id=968 bgcolor=#d6d6d6
| 590968 ||  || — || August 29, 2006 || Lulin || LUSS ||  || align=right | 3.0 km || 
|-id=969 bgcolor=#C2FFFF
| 590969 ||  || — || January 5, 2013 || Mount Lemmon || Mount Lemmon Survey || L4 || align=right | 10 km || 
|-id=970 bgcolor=#C2FFFF
| 590970 ||  || — || January 10, 2013 || Haleakala || Pan-STARRS || L4 || align=right | 7.8 km || 
|-id=971 bgcolor=#C2FFFF
| 590971 ||  || — || May 10, 2005 || Cerro Tololo || M. W. Buie, L. H. Wasserman || L4 || align=right | 7.0 km || 
|-id=972 bgcolor=#C2FFFF
| 590972 ||  || — || January 5, 2013 || Kitt Peak || Spacewatch || L4 || align=right | 10 km || 
|-id=973 bgcolor=#E9E9E9
| 590973 ||  || — || December 18, 2003 || Kitt Peak || Spacewatch ||  || align=right | 1.4 km || 
|-id=974 bgcolor=#d6d6d6
| 590974 ||  || — || March 12, 2003 || Palomar || NEAT || EOS || align=right | 2.9 km || 
|-id=975 bgcolor=#C2FFFF
| 590975 ||  || — || April 2, 2002 || Palomar || NEAT || L4 || align=right | 8.3 km || 
|-id=976 bgcolor=#fefefe
| 590976 ||  || — || January 4, 2013 || Kitt Peak || Spacewatch ||  || align=right data-sort-value="0.75" | 750 m || 
|-id=977 bgcolor=#C2FFFF
| 590977 ||  || — || April 8, 2003 || Kitt Peak || Spacewatch || L4 || align=right | 8.8 km || 
|-id=978 bgcolor=#C2FFFF
| 590978 ||  || — || October 20, 2012 || Mount Lemmon || Mount Lemmon Survey || L4 || align=right | 8.7 km || 
|-id=979 bgcolor=#C2FFFF
| 590979 ||  || — || August 3, 2008 || Siding Spring || SSS || L4 || align=right | 11 km || 
|-id=980 bgcolor=#C2FFFF
| 590980 ||  || — || January 4, 2013 || Mount Lemmon || Mount Lemmon Survey || L4 || align=right | 8.9 km || 
|-id=981 bgcolor=#C2FFFF
| 590981 ||  || — || October 29, 2010 || Mount Lemmon || Mount Lemmon Survey || L4 || align=right | 7.0 km || 
|-id=982 bgcolor=#C2FFFF
| 590982 ||  || — || November 12, 2010 || Mount Lemmon || Mount Lemmon Survey || L4 || align=right | 8.3 km || 
|-id=983 bgcolor=#C2FFFF
| 590983 ||  || — || September 16, 2009 || Kitt Peak || Spacewatch || L4 || align=right | 6.5 km || 
|-id=984 bgcolor=#fefefe
| 590984 ||  || — || September 1, 2005 || Kitt Peak || Spacewatch ||  || align=right data-sort-value="0.40" | 400 m || 
|-id=985 bgcolor=#C2FFFF
| 590985 ||  || — || January 9, 2013 || Kitt Peak || Spacewatch || L4 || align=right | 6.9 km || 
|-id=986 bgcolor=#d6d6d6
| 590986 ||  || — || March 27, 2003 || Palomar || NEAT ||  || align=right | 3.0 km || 
|-id=987 bgcolor=#C2FFFF
| 590987 ||  || — || January 4, 2013 || Cerro Tololo-DECam || CTIO-DECam || L4 || align=right | 7.7 km || 
|-id=988 bgcolor=#d6d6d6
| 590988 ||  || — || January 4, 2013 || Cerro Tololo-DECam || CTIO-DECam ||  || align=right | 1.9 km || 
|-id=989 bgcolor=#d6d6d6
| 590989 ||  || — || November 23, 2006 || Kitt Peak || Spacewatch ||  || align=right | 2.6 km || 
|-id=990 bgcolor=#d6d6d6
| 590990 ||  || — || January 20, 2013 || Mount Lemmon || Mount Lemmon Survey ||  || align=right | 2.0 km || 
|-id=991 bgcolor=#C2FFFF
| 590991 ||  || — || January 20, 2013 || Mount Lemmon || Mount Lemmon Survey || L4 || align=right | 9.2 km || 
|-id=992 bgcolor=#d6d6d6
| 590992 ||  || — || October 21, 2006 || Kitt Peak || Spacewatch ||  || align=right | 1.9 km || 
|-id=993 bgcolor=#d6d6d6
| 590993 ||  || — || January 4, 2013 || Cerro Tololo-DECam || CTIO-DECam ||  || align=right | 1.9 km || 
|-id=994 bgcolor=#d6d6d6
| 590994 ||  || — || March 29, 2008 || Mount Lemmon || Mount Lemmon Survey ||  || align=right | 2.1 km || 
|-id=995 bgcolor=#d6d6d6
| 590995 ||  || — || January 4, 2013 || Cerro Tololo-DECam || CTIO-DECam ||  || align=right | 2.4 km || 
|-id=996 bgcolor=#d6d6d6
| 590996 ||  || — || January 18, 2013 || Haleakala || Pan-STARRS ||  || align=right | 2.2 km || 
|-id=997 bgcolor=#C2FFFF
| 590997 ||  || — || August 16, 2009 || Kitt Peak || Spacewatch || L4 || align=right | 5.9 km || 
|-id=998 bgcolor=#E9E9E9
| 590998 ||  || — || February 4, 2009 || Mount Lemmon || Mount Lemmon Survey ||  || align=right data-sort-value="0.85" | 850 m || 
|-id=999 bgcolor=#d6d6d6
| 590999 ||  || — || January 14, 2013 || Haleakala || Pan-STARRS ||  || align=right | 3.3 km || 
|-id=000 bgcolor=#d6d6d6
| 591000 ||  || — || January 5, 2013 || Mount Lemmon || Mount Lemmon Survey ||  || align=right | 1.9 km || 
|}

References

External links 
 Discovery Circumstances: Numbered Minor Planets (590001)–(595000) (IAU Minor Planet Center)

0590